The 2018 St. Louis Cardinals season was the 137th for the St. Louis Cardinals of Major League Baseball (MLB), a franchise in St. Louis, Missouri. It was the 127th season for the Cardinals in the National League (NL), and their 13th at Busch Stadium III.

Forbes ranked the Cardinals as the seventh-highest valued team of the 30 teams in 2017 for its $1.9 billion valuation (+6%), with a $319 million revenue, and $40 million operating income. The Cardinals also had baseball's second-highest local television rating, averaging 7.18 on FS Midwest. On September 29, the Dodgers beat the Giants, keeping the Cardinals out of the playoffs for a third consecutive season, a first since 1997–1999.

Off-season

Overview

Busch Stadium update
The Cardinals removed several sections of seats in right field and began construction on a new mingling area like the ones at Coors Field (Colorado Rockies), and Petco Park (San Diego Padres). The area will have bars and open spaces from which to watch games, and it will be open to all fans at the ballpark. The Cardinals sold ticket subscriptions this past year, and such a mix zone in the ballpark would be a place to go for standing-room only. The area is scheduled to open with the 2018 season. The new space will be called Budweiser Terrace, renovating a  area that cost the club 1,000 seats from six sections on the fourth level. In their place, they will be adding two full-service bars, standing areas, and lounge seating from which fans can still view the full playing field. This area will be used by live bands/DJs and for outdoor games, Cardinals Theme Ticket events and other pregame performances. Seating and lounge areas in the Budweiser Terrace will be available to fans on a first-come, first-served basis and will not require a special ticket for access. The renovations are scheduled to be completed ahead of the Cardinals' 2018 home opener on April 5. The website is: http://www.cardinals.com/budweiserterrace.

Injuries
Adam Wainwright was scheduled to undergo elbow surgery on October 3, 2017, for a bone bruise there; he will have a piece of cartilage shaved down. Doctors said he will need six weeks of recovery before beginning rehabilitation. He last pitched two innings in relief on September 23, 2017, before the Cardinals shut him down for the remainder of 2017. He finished the season 12–5 with a 5.11 ERA. Only eight of his 23 starts registered as quality.

Coaching staff changes

The Cardinals wasted no time making changes to personnel after the October 1, 2017, end to that frustrating baseball season with a third-place finish, their lowest since 2008. Pitching coach Derek Lilliquist and bullpen coach Blaise Ilsley were told on October 3, 2017, they would not be retained for the 2018 season. John Mozeliak, President of Baseball Operations noted that the organization would like to employ a pitching coach who is more willing to utilize advanced metrics and data compiled by the baseball operations staff. The Cardinals were among a growing number of teams to utilize an eight-man bullpen for the majority of the season, a move that came out of a league wide trend of starters not pitching as deeply into games. That has made in-game pitching decisions more complex and increasingly data driven. After posting a Major-League low 2.94 ERA in 2015, the Cardinals' team ERA jumped to 4.08 in 2016, and 4.01 in 2017. Those represented the club's highest season ERAs since Matheny took over as manager. Mozeliak said he expects the rest of manager Mike Matheny's staff to return in 2018. The exception to that is Ron "Pop" Warner, who stepped in as "quality control coach" when the organization underwent a midseason 2017 staff shakeup. Warner is likely to return to his previous role of assistant field coordinator. Bench coach for the past three seasons, David Bell, left the team on October 20, 2017, to become the vice president of player development for the San Francisco Giants.

On October 23, 2017, the Cardinals announced that Jose Oquendo, 54, would return as third base coach, after a two-year hiatus in which he recovered from multiple knee surgeries and served as a special assistant to the general manager at the team's Roger Dean Stadium (Jupiter, Florida) complex. Before his March 2016 leave of absence, he served for 16 years in that same job title, and played the majority of his 12-year career with the Cardinals, 1986–95. Former centerfielder and 1985 NL MVP, Willie McGee, 58, joins the coaching staff for the first time, not yet given a job title. He was a special assistant to the GM in 2013, after an 18-year playing career; 13 with the Cardinals, 1982–90, 1996–99. He has become a regular guest instructor at Spring Training, and he made frequent visits to the organization's affiliates to assist with instruction. Mike Shildt, 48, has been promoted to bench coach from quality control and then third base coach in his 2017 position as a first-year coach, filling the vacancy left when David Bell accepted a job with the San Francisco Giants. Shildt previously managed for eight years in the Cardinals' farm system. Ron ("Pop") Warner will return to his role as assistant field coordinator.

Three days after hiring their third base coach and bench coach, the Cardinals on October 26, hired long-time MLB pitching coach Mike Maddux, 56, older brother of Hall of Fame pitcher Greg Maddux. Mike Maddux was the Washington Nationals pitching coach for the past two seasons. The Cardinals also promoted AAA-Memphis pitching coach Bryan Eversgerd, 48, as their new bullpen coach, who has been a pitching coach for 15 years, including the last five with Memphis.

Player acquisitions and departures

2017
On November 2, LH Zach Duke, RH Lance Lynn, Juan Nicasio, and Seung Hwan Oh elected to be free agents.

On November 6, the Cardinals decided to give an unconditional release to RH (former) closer Trevor Rosenthal, making him a free agent. He was in recovery from Tommy John surgery from August, making him unavailable for most of the 2018 season. Rosenthal was under team control for 2018, but the Cardinals would have had to pay him a salary well beyond what he would be able to pitch. Other moves from the 40-man roster included removing SS Alex Mejia and C Alberto Rosario both outrighted to the AAA-Memphis Redbirds, bringing the roster down from 36 to 34, with Rosenthal on the 60-day disabled list. The Cardinals put a higher value on keeping a roster spot open for the coming season and this winter. They have a handful of prospects that must be added to the 40-man roster to be protected from the Rule 5 draft. The deadline to do that is November 20, 7pm CT. As expected, the Cardinals tendered a qualifying offer to RH starter Lance Lynn, 30. The one-year, $17.4-million deal will be rejected by Lynn as he enters free agency. It does mean that the Cardinals will secure a compensatory draft pick if Lynn signs with another team. That pick will come after the second round. Shortstop Paul DeJong is one of the top three vote-getters for the National League Rookie of the Year award. No other free agents with the Cardinals were offered a qualifying offer. Lynn has until 4pm CT on Thu. November 16 to decide whether to accept or decline the qualifying offer. He is expected to decline. If he signs elsewhere, the value of his new contract would not be a factor in determining the slot of that Competitive Balance Round B pick. He made a team-high 33 starts in 2017, finishing with an 11–8 record and 3.43 ERA. His home run rate (1.3 per nine innings) and walk rate (10.1 percent) were career highs, but Lynn's durability and career 124 ERA+ should make him one of the more attractive free-agent starters. Lynn rejected the qualifying offer, and became a first-time free agent, one of nine players in MLB who also rejected the $17.4 million one-year offer.

The Cardinals receive a Competitive Balance Round A draft pick (#39), assigned between the first and second rounds because of the reverse order in the standings from the 2017 season. They will also pick #19 in the first round.

The Cardinals added four players to the 40-man roster before the 7pm CT deadline on November 20, to protect them from the Rule 5 draft, bringing the roster to 39. The categories are: 19 pitchers, 2 catchers, 9 infielders, and 9 outfielders. Protected are three in the team's Top 20 prospects: RHP Derian Gonzalez (22), LHP Austin Gomber (24 on Nov. 23, 2017; #15 prospect), plus two OF's: Tyler O'Neill (22; #4 prospect), and Oscar Mercado (22, #18 prospect). The most notable player left unprotected by the Cardinals is corner infielder Patrick Wisdom, who slugged .507 with 25 doubles, 31 homers and 89 RBIs for AAA-Memphis last season. He will be available for Rule 5 selection, along with Daniel Poncedeleon, Matt Pearce, Trey Nielsen, Andrew Morales and others. Wisdom has been passed over in the Rule 5 Draft before. O'Neill was acquired in a Trade Deadline swap with the Seattle Mariners in July 2017, and the former third-round pick finished the year with 31 homers and 95 RBIs at the Triple-A level. O'Neill has a career .850 OPS in the Minors. Gomber was a fourth-round selection by the Cardinals in the 2013 MLB Draft, he went 10–7 with a 3.34 ERA, 1.168 WHIP and 140 strikeouts over 143 innings at Double-A Springfield in '17. Mercado was drafted as a shortstop in the 2013 MLB Draft, he became a full-time outfielder for the first time in 2017. He coupled a smooth defensive transition with his best offensive season, slashing .287/.341/.428 with a .769 OPS in 120 games with Double-A Springfield. Mercado, then followed with a standout showing in the Arizona Fall League. Gonzalez went 4–7 with a 4.33 ERA in 18 games (15 starts) for Class A Advanced Palm Beach last season. In 79 innings, Gonzalez struck out 72, walked 30 and posted a 1.37 WHIP. The Cardinals signed Gonzalez as a non-drafted free agent out of Venezuela in September 2012. Eligibility for the Rule 5 Draft is dependent upon how old a player was when he signed with the organization. Players who signed at the age of 18 or younger become eligible after five seasons. Those who were 19 or older have four years before they must be protected. This year's Rule 5 Draft is scheduled for December 14, the final day of baseball's Winter Meetings in Lake Buena Vista, FL.

SS Aledmys Diaz, 27, was traded for minor leaguer (A-level, Midwest League) OF prospect J.B. Woodman, 22, in the Toronto Blue Jays organization, on December 1, dropping the 40-man roster number to 38. Diaz hit .259 with a .682 OPS in 79 games. Woodman, the Jays' second-round Draft pick in 2016, was Toronto's No. 28 prospect according to MLBPipeline.com. The left-handed-hitting outfielder batted .240 with a .699 OPS, seven home runs and eight steals in 96 games for the Class A Lansing in 2017. Woodman, who turns 23 on Dec. 13, has mostly played center and right field. Starter Michael Wacha, OF'er Randal Grichuk, and LH-reliever Tyler Lyons, all arbitration-eligible, were unsurprisingly offered contracts for next season.

On December 5, the Cardinals signed RH starter Miles Mikolas, 29, in a two-year deal for $15.5 million. He had pitched in Japan (Yomiuri Giants) since 2015, with a record over 62 games of 31–13 with a 2.18 ERA, striking out 378 batters in  innings. In 2017, he had an 8.13 strikeouts/walk rate. He last pitched in MLB for the Texas Rangers in 2014. He was born in Jupiter, Florida, where the Cardinals hold spring training.

On December 8, the Cardinals failed to acquire Giancarlo Stanton, 28, the reigning NL MVP (2017, .281 59 HR, 132 RBI), when he turned down the Cardinals' trade offer to him, because of his no-trade clause with the Miami Marlins. He has 10 years and $295 million remaining from his November 2014 ($325 million, 13-years) contract, plus an after age-30 opt-out with the Marlins. A report by Craig Mish of SiriusXM late Thursday (December 7) indicated that Stanton would accept trades only to the Dodgers, Cubs, Yankees and Astros. Knowing that they have been eliminated from the mix now allows the Cardinals to focus their attention elsewhere as they seek to upgrade the offense with the addition of a middle-of-the-order hitter. The Cardinals have prepared for this pivot by spending the last several weeks having conversations with other teams and agents about potential Plan B fits. Stanton later that same day, turned down an offer from the San Francisco Giants. Stanton has reportedly signed a deal, pending a physical, with the New York Yankees on December 9. Stanton said about the Cardinals and the Giants: "But that just wasn't the fit for me. We (the Marlins and Cardinals) shared the same spring training, so I've noticed how they go about their business, how it's a winning-first culture, the fans, everything," Stanton said. "It's a great organization."

The Cardinals announced the signing of free agent RH reliever Luke Gregerson, 33, on December 13. It was a reunion, because the Cardinals selected him back in the 28th round of the 2006 MLB Draft. Gregerson spent five years with the San Diego Padres before pitching for the Oakland A's and Houston Astros. He posted a 4.57 ERA and gave up 13 home runs in 61 innings pitched. But he has a career 3.02 ERA and a 9.1 K/9 rate over nine MLB seasons.

The big impact bat the Cardinals were searching for happened on December 13, finalized on December 14, with the trade of Marcell Ozuna (LF), 27, from the Miami Marlins. The Cardinals gave up prospects Magneuris Sierra (OF), and pitchers Sandy Alcantara (RH), 22, the centerpiece of the deal, Zac Gallen (RH), 22, and Daniel Castano (LH), 23. Ozuna hit .312/.376/.548, 37 HR, 124 RBI in 2017. Ozuna will likely stay in left with the Cardinals, who plan to use Tommy Pham in center field and Dexter Fowler in right. It's an alignment the Cards can keep for at least the next two seasons, as Ozuna will not become a free agent until after the 2019 season. Castano, (LHP), 23, is unranked among the Cardinals' top 30 prospects, while Alcantara is the 9th-rated prospect, and Gallen the 13th.

The Cardinals completed a deal with the Oakland Athletics also on December 14, trying to unload the outfield logjam, sending Stephen Piscotty (OF), 26, to them, in exchange for infield prospects Yairo Munoz, 22 (RH, SS), and Max Schrock, 23, (LH, 2b). Piscotty is a Bay Area native, took time off in 2017 to be with his mother, struggling with ALS. Piscotty hit .235/.342/.367, 9 HR, 39 RBIs (341 AB, 107 G) in 2017. Munoz, who signed with the A's in 2012, hit .267 in six Minor League seasons with Oakland, totaling 41 home runs in 473 games. He hit .300 between Double-A Midland and Triple-A Nashville this year, and he plays multiple positions. He was ranked No. 13 among A's prospects by MLBPipeline.com. Schrock, primarily a second baseman, also had a nice season, earning a place on the Texas League Midseason and Postseason All-Star teams after batting .321 with seven homers and 46 RBIs for Midland. He was Oakland's No. 17 prospect The Cardinals gave Piscotty a six-year $33.5 million extension prior to his ill-fated 2017 season.

2018
On January 11, Randal Grichuk became the first of four arbitration-eligible players to reach an agreement as he signed a one-year $2.6 million contract. Grichuk made $557,200 in 2017, entered the offseason eligible for arbitration for the first time in his career. In 442 plate appearances last season, Grichuk slashed .238/.285/.473 for a .758 OPS. The deal comes one day before clubs and any remaining unsigned arbitration-eligible players will exchange desired salary figures. Michael Wacha, Marcell Ozuna, and Tyler Lyons, all of whom remain unsigned, need to find common ground with the Cardinals without bringing a third-party arbiter in to make the decision. The next day, the other three arbitration-eligible players signed contracts. All agreed to 1-year deals, and the amounts were not disclosed by the Cardinals, but MLB Network insider Jon Heyman said Ozuna's contract is worth $9 million up from $3.5 million. The St. Louis Post-Dispatch reporter Derrick Goold said Wacha's salary almost doubled from $2.775 million to $5.3 million. Tyler Lyons earned $549,800 in 2017, and will receive $1.2 million in 2018.

President of Baseball Operations, John Mozeliak said on January 13, that (RHP) Luke Gregerson, 33, will be the new closer, "going into the season. ... He has experience doing it." The former Houston Astro pitcher returns to the Cards' organization with 66 career saves, including 31 for the 2015 Houston Astros that made the postseason. He had a 4.57 ERA in 2017, while giving up 13 homers in 61 innings. But in his eight previous seasons, the highest ERA he ever posted was 3.28. And for his career, Gregerson has a 9.1 strikeout-per-nine-inning rate. In 2017, he was 2–3, with 1 save, walking 20, and giving up 62 hits with a 1.344 WHIP.

On January 19, the Cardinals traded OF Randal Grichuk to the Toronto Blue Jays for two RH relievers: Dominic Leone, 26, and Connor Greene, 22. Leone ranked 12th among qualifying American League relievers with a 2.56 ERA last season and struck out 81 in 70 1/3 innings. Leone had success against both right-handed (.211 average) and left-handed (.183) batters, while posting a 1.05 WHIP and registering 11 holds. Leone stranded 78 percent of inherited runners, the 13th-highest percentage among AL relievers. The Cardinals will have him under team control for another four seasons. Greene reached Double-A last year, and finished 5–10 with a 5.29 ERA in 26 games (25 starts). He struck out 92 and walked 83 over 132 2/3 innings. According to MLB Pipeline's scouting report, Greene features a fastball in the mid-to-upper 90s, as well as an above-average changeup. He is also developing a slider and curveball, both of which scouts believe will improve once he finds a more consistent release point. With the additions of Leone and Greene, the Cardinals' 40-man roster is once again full. This marks the second trade the Cardinals have made with the Blue Jays this winter. In December, the Cardinals dealt away shortstop Aledmys Diaz for Minor League outfielder J.B. Woodman.

Eleven days (Feb. 2) before pitchers and catchers were to report (Feb. 13) to Spring Training, the Cardinals invited 23 players as Non-roster invites (NRI). Included are 10 pitchers, five catchers, six infielders, and two outfielders. The pitching prospects are headed by Dakota Hudson, Jordan Hicks, and Ryan Helsley, who are ranked 7, 13, and 22, respectively in the 2017 Top 30 Prospect list  by MLB Pipeline. A snapshot of the 23 NRIs with their jersey's new numbers are listed at the reference. The beat writer (Goold) provides a status report on these NRIs.

The Cardinals officially signed RH reliever Bud Norris on February 14. To make room for him on the 40-man roster, the team designated for assignment RH Rowan Wick. Wick was claimed off waivers on February 16, by the San Diego Padres.

Former reliever and closer Jason Motte, 35, was signed to a minor league deal on February 19, and given an invite to Spring Training. He joins nine other NRI pitchers trying to make the roster. Motte steadily climbed the Cardinals' bullpen depth chart for six seasons after debuting with the club in 2008, elevating to the closer role late during the '11 season, and finishing with a NL-best 42 saves in 2012, with a 2.75 ERA and a career-high 72 innings. Using predominantly a fastball that could reach triple digits, Motte struck out 10.8 batters per nine innings that season, walking just 2.1 batters per nine.

Francisco Pena (C) was signed and given an invitation to spring training on February 23. He is left-handed in everything but throwing. No left-handed player has caught in the Major Leagues, even semi-regularly, since Fred Tenney in 1902. Francisco's father was former Cardinals' catcher Tony Pena for three seasons, 1987–89

Former Cardinas' closer Edward Mujica, 33, was signed to a minor league contract on March 15, and got the save in the March 17 game.

Spring training

Schedule
The Cardinals announced their spring training schedule on November 2, 2017. They will play 30 games in the Grapefruit League starting on Friday, February 23, against the Miami Marlins, who share the Roger Dean Stadium complex with the Cardinals in Palm Beach. The schedule consists of 14 home games and 16 road games, with four of the latter at Roger Dean Stadium with the Marlins as the home team. Cardinals' pitchers and catchers are scheduled to report to Jupiter, Fla., on Tuesday, Feb. 13, while the rest of the team will report on Sunday, Feb. 18. After their set of Spring Training games, the Cardinals will break camp on Sunday March 25, and play two exhibition games against the Toronto Blue Jays at Olympic Stadium in Montreal on March 26 and 27. The regular season will begin on Thursday, March 29, with a road game against the New York Mets.

The first physicals and official workouts began for pitchers and catchers on (Wed.) February 14.

They were 3–3–0 (Feb. 23-Feb. 28), and 14–10–2 (Mar. 1–27) for a 17–13–2 (.567) record, fifth-best in the Grapefruit League. including the two exhibition games, Mar. 26–27) against the Toronto Blue Jays. in Olympic Stadium in Montreal, their first visit to Montreal since May 2004. March 26 game: W 5–3. March 27 game: L 0–1.

Miscellaneous
Tommy Pham (CF) was named to MLB writer Anthony Castrovince's "2018 All-Underrated Team" on February 7. Rookie Jack Flaherty will start the first Grapefruit League opener for the Cardinals against the Miami Marlins on (Fri.) February 23. He was 0–2 with a 6.33 ERA in six games (five starts) in 2017. MLBPipeline ranks him as the #38 prospect in baseball .

Paul DeJong (SS), signed a six-year contract extension finalized on March 5, worth a guaranteed total of $26 million, through the 2023 season. The deal also includes two option years and a total possible value of $51.5 million, confirmed a source. The deal is one of the largest ever given to a player who has not had a full year of service. DeJong did not reach the majors until May 28 for the 2017 Cardinals, taking over the shortstop position, swatting a team-high 25 HRs as the #3 hitter in the lineup. He hit .285, with 65 RBIs, and his 25 HRs led all NL shortstops. He hit 38 HRs total in 2017, counting the 13 he hit for the AAA Memphis Redbirds. He was runner-up in the 2017 NL Rookie of the Year Award.

On the same day the Cardinals signed DeJong, they renewed Tommy Pham (CF) for 2018, three days before his 30th birthday, and he signed for $570,000; one of the largest contracts for a third-year player. Discussions on a two-year deal never went anywhere. Pham will be arbitration-eligible after this season. He came a few days shy of being arbitration-eligible because he was in the minors, cracking out production, for a few extra days.

Free agent and former Cardinals' starter Lance Lynn signed a one-year deal with the Minnesota Twins (AL) for $12 million. It was less than the $17.4 million in a qualifying offer the Cardinals extended to him in the off-season. Minnesota needed to strengthen their pitching that ranked 19th (of 30) with a 4.59 ERA in 2017. Lynn was 11–8, with a 3.43 ERA with 33 starts in 2017. The signing guarantees the Cardinals will secure a compensatory draft pick. That pick will come after the second round.

Injuries
Tyler O'Neill (OF), 22, is battling a strained, left oblique muscle, and has yet to appear in a game, as of March 4. Arturo Reyes (P), who had an ankle injury at the start of camp, will rejoin the big-league camp. He's available to pitch in the coming days. There are 56 in major-league camp.

Matt Carpenter (INF) may not be ready by Opening Day, March 29, due to an ongoing back injury. No Cardinals' player has appeared in more games over the last five years than Carpenter, whom Matheny tabbed as his No. 3 hitter before camp opened. Nearly a month later, Carpenter has been one of the least visible players in camp, his days spent rehabbing in the trainer's room.

Prospective closer Luke Gregerson was also battling an irritated oblique muscle, first reported on (Tue.) March 6. He will be held back for at least one week, and possibly two weeks. Spring Training ends on Sun. March 25. He has pitched three scoreless innings in Grapefruit League play this spring, but he had not pitched since March 20 because of a left hamstring sprain suffered after the oblique strain. He will start the season on the DL, manager Mike Matheny announced on March 24.

Announced on March 25, Adam Wainwright (#2 starter) will also begin the season on the disabled list, with a left hamstring strain, injured during conditioning drills. He will miss the home opener on April 5. Jack Flaherty will be the fifth starter.

Cuts
Jordan Schafer, Jacob Woodford, Hector Mendoza, and Daniel Poncedelon, were four pitchers, plus catchers Jeremy Martinez and Dennis Ortega, and infielder Max Schrock, all seven on the NRI list, cut to minor-league camp following the 1–4 loss on March 4, leaving 17 on the NRI list.

Nine were cut on March 11. 46 now in camp. Optioned to AAA-Memphis were: Tyler O'Neill (OF), Edmundo Sosa (INF), and Austin Gomber (LHP). Optioned to AA-Springfield were: Derian Gonzalez (RHP), and Connor Greene (RHP). Reassigned 4 NRIs to minor-league camp were: Ryan Helsley (RHP), Dakota Hudson (RHP), and Arturo Reyes (RHP), and Tommy Edman (INF).

Six players were optioned on March 18, including two of their top prospects. Jack Flaherty (RHP) and Carson Kelly (C), plus pitchers John Gant (RH) and Ryan Sherriff (LH), plus Breyvic Valera (2B), and Oscar Mercado (OF). Flaherty, the #2 Cardinals prospect, struck out 20 batters over 13 innings, forcing officials to look past his 4.85 ERA over four starts. Much of that was skewed by one bad inning against Baltimore, when he allowed a grand slam to Manny Machado. Kelly, the #3 Cardinals' prospect, went 3-for-30 (.100) this spring.

The Cardinals gave their former closer Jason Motte, 35, his unconditional release on March 21, but he has two days to find a job with another major league team. If he clears that two-day period without an offer, he can elect to return to the Cardinals and has already been told they have a spot for him. He would have to sign a new deal, as he'll be a free agent. If Motte agrees, he'll be assigned to Class AAA Memphis at that time, an official said. This series of moves is necessary because of the service time Motte has and his rights as a major-league free agent who agreed to a minor-league deal.

Three were optioned to AAA-Memphis on March 23. Josh Lucas (P), Luke Voit (1B), and Harrison Bader (OF) were the ones selected. Yairo Muñoz, 23, had a terrific spring training, winning the final bench spot over Bader. Muñoz's versatility gave him the edge over Bader, who is strictly an outfielder. Munoz played five positions, hitting .375/.423/.625 with 18 hits and 3 HRs, scoring 13 runs over 48 at-bats. The Cardinals expected Munoz to begin the year at AAA, where he held his own in 2017, after slugging through the Texas League. Munoz hit .289/.316/.414 in 65 games at AAA. He was acquired in the off-season trade that sent Stephen Piscotty to the Oakland Athletics. These cuts reduced the active roster to 26, with one more remaining between right-handers John Brebbia and Mike Mayers, for the final bullpen spot. Muñoz has played shortstop, center field, right field, and second base. Manager Mike Matheny said on Muñoz's varied skills, ""I haven't seen anyone whose two primary positions are center field and shortstop." Luke Gregerson (P), earlier troubled by an oblique strain, did not make a road trip from Jupiter because of a "mild" hamstring injury, and would be probable that since he was not fully healthy, would be played on the 10-day disabled list. He was targeted to be the Cardinals' closer, has pitched just three innings, retiring all nine hitters faced.

Francisco Peña (C), Muñoz, José Martínez (OF), and Greg Garcia will make up a four-man bench, with 13 pitchers for Opening Day.

Mike Mayers (RHP) and John Brebbia (RHP) will both be on the 25-man roster, with Luke Gregerson (10-day DL) and Alex Reyes probably on the 60-day DL. Mayers in spring training pitched 12 innings, striking out 13, giving up just five hits, with no runs, no walks. Gregerson has a grade 1 strain, the least severe, and will be out for at least two weeks.

In a stunning change of heart by the Cardinals in one week, High Class-A pitcher Jordan Hicks (RHP), 21, was promoted to the Opening Day roster on March 27, with John Brebbia optioned to AAA-Memphis. Hicks has a fastball that was clocked at 102 mph during spring training, and throws a fastball at 99 mph that has sink to it. He offsets that pitch with a slider that he can throw for a strike, and a changeup that showed greater command and depth this past spring. He was demoted from big-league camp early because he had failed to be punctual for at least two mandatory team functions. To make room for Hicks and backup catcher Francisco Peña on the 40-man roster, the Cardinals will have to make two corresponding moves. They intend to designate a player for assignment, and not place Alex Reyes on the 60-day disabled list because that would push Reyes' return to May 28, at the earliest. Hicks, the Cardinals #7 Prospect , was 8–3 with a 2.74 ERA in 22 games (19 starts) split between Class A Peoria, and High Class-A in 2017. He struck out 95 batters, and allowed just three home runs in 105 Minor League innings.

In the final tweaks to the roster for the regular season on March 28, Alex Reyes was placed on the regular 10-day DL, designated two players: infielder Breyvic Valera, and pitcher Josh Lucas. Francisco Peña was added to the 40-man roster, as was Jordan Hicks.

Season standings

National League playoff standings

National League head-to-head records

Regular season summary
The Cardinals announced their 2018 schedule on September 12, 2017. They open on the road versus the New York Mets on March 29, their earliest date ever. A day off and then the March 31, and April 1 games complete that series. It will mark the first time the Cardinals have opened the season at Citi Field, and the team's first opener in New York since 1996, when the Mets still played at Shea Stadium. They host the Arizona D-backs in their home opener on April 5. First pitch at Busch Stadium that day is scheduled for 6:15 p.m. CT. The Cardinals are also slated to finish the season at Wrigley Field, marking the first time the Cardinals and Cubs will end the regular season against each other in Chicago since 1991. MLB pushed up the start of the 2018 season in order to accommodate the addition of four extra off-days during the six-month season.

Busch Stadium ranking 
Busch Stadium ranked third out of the 30 baseball stadiums by Forbes magazine on March 19. The methodology includes: overall aesthetics of the ballpark design, including integration with additional structures, such as in Baltimore and San Diego; its setting; the visuals from within the seating bowl or surrounding views; the amenities offered at the facility; historic relevance; and external development that adds to the experience. AT&T Park (San Francisco Giants), and Oriole Park (Baltimore Orioles) were one and two, respectively. Maury Brown ranked Busch Stadium third, "thanks to the incredible views of the Gateway Arch and downtown St. Louis."

Rawlings sold
St. Louis County-based Rawlings Sporting Goods (est. 1887) is sold from Newell Brands, announced on June 5, to a Los Angeles private equity firm, Seidler Equity Partners (SEP) owning LA Fitness, with MLB a co-investor in the $395 million deal. Rawlings employs 150 people in the St. Louis area, and 1,200 globally. The deal is expected to close by mid-July. Rawlings previously made some custom baseball gloves at its plant in Washington, Missouri, but no longer makes any baseball gloves in the United States, with the factory open.

Opening Day
As expected, Carlos Martinez was named on March 10 to start on Opening Day, March 29. Few aces are as undisputed as Martinez, who set career highs in starts, complete games, innings and strikeouts last season, when he made his second National League All-Star team. It will be his second consecutive Opening Day start.

Opening Day did not go as planned with a disappointing loss to the New York Mets, 4–9. Carlos Martinez walked six, hit another batter, gave up five hits, and allowed five runs in  innings. Rookie reliever Jordan Hicks made his major-league debut, giving up an infield hit, but getting a double-play ball and then an inning-ending strikeout, his first.

March
The Cardinals found a closer in free agent Greg Holland (RHP), 32, reaching agreement with him a few hours before the first pitch on Opening Day. Making it official is contingent on him passing a physical. Holland signed a one-year deal for a reported $14 million. He led the NL with 41 saves last season with the Colorado Rockies, and had a 3.61 ERA in an MLB-best 58 games finished. He signed for less than the qualifying offer the Rockies offered this past winter, and the Cardinals lose a draft pick. Holland missed all of 2016, recovering from Tommy John surgery. He recorded 166 saves in four seasons before the injury, including an NL-best 41 in 2017 with the Rockies. He won the NL's Comeback Player of the Year Award last season. He owns a 2.60 ERA over 377 career innings, and has struck out 11.9 per 9 IP over the course of his seven-year career. He went 3–6 with a 3.61 ERA for Colorado last season, when he struck out 70 batters in 57 1/3 innings. His numbers took a dive after the 2017 All-Star break. He saved 28 games with a 1.62 ERA in the first half, but saved only 13 with a 6.38 ERA in 26 games after it. In another last-minute change, the Cardinals decided on March 31 to make room for the now-finalized Holland purchase by delaying Alex Reyes return in changing his 10-day DL to the 60-day DL, which makes him ineligible to return until May 28. Holland was optioned to the High-A Palm Beach team for a required minimum of 10 days. Brett Cecil (LH reliever) was placed on the DL.

In another move on March 31, the team traded Josh Lucas (RH) to the Oakland A's for pitching prospect Casey Meinser (RH), 22, presently at the AA level. Lucas was DFA'd prior.

For MARCH, the team played two games, with a 0–2 record, scoring 6 runs, giving up 15.

April
On April 1, the Cardinals traded previously-DFA'd INF Breyvic Valera to the Los Angeles Dodgers for Johan Mieses (OF), 22. Mieses led the California League (High-A) with 28 home runs in 2016. He excelled at Class A Advanced (High-A) again last season, but struggled after a promotion to AA-Tulsa (Texas League), where he hit .160/.246/.347 over 90 games. He has been assigned to High-A Palm Beach.

Jack Flaherty, 22, was optioned to AAA-Memphis on April 4, after pitching a masterful game at Milwaukee the night before. He struck out nine, and allowed one run over five innings against them. Adam Wainwright, 36, will return from the DL to make his first start, the home opener on (Thu.) April 5. He is a three-time All-Star over 12 seasons for the Birds. He missed six games and one start while on the disabled list.

Ryan Sherriff, suffered a right great toe fracture from a hit ball on April 5, landing on the DL on April 8. John Brebbia was recalled from AAA-Memphis.

A bench-clearing incident that started with a vulgarity to Yadier Molina from Arizona Diamondbacks' manager Torey Lovullo in the second inning of the April 8 game, led to the ejection of only the manager. He was suspended for arguing balls and strikes on A.J. Pollock, with Molina suspended for making contact with home plate umpire Tim Timmons. Molina is appealing and will play until his appeal is heard; managers cannot appeal. On April 10, MLB gave one-game suspensions to both, and the manager was fined. Umpire Timmons said the contact from Molina was incidental in going after the manager, and that is why he was not ejected. Crew chief Mike Winters said all details will be on his report, including the specific expletive used. Molina dropped his suspension appeal on the morning of April 11 for that afternoon game, and sat out the rubber game of the Brewers' series. Manager Matheny had planned to rest Molina, his first off-day after 11 consecutive games played from the start of the season, as it was a day game after a night game.

Greg Holland was recalled on April 9, with Mike Mayers optioned to AAA, with Holland making his Cardinals' debut that evening.

Sam Tuivailala was placed on the DL on April 12, with a left knee sprain, Mike Mayers was recalled.

On April 13, at the end of the fifth inning against Cincinnati in Cincinnati, Yadier Molina passed the Reds' catching icon Johnny Bench for 13th place in MLB history, having caught 14,489.1 innings in his 15-year career. With the remaining four innings, Molina has 14,493.1 innings as catcher. Former Cardinals' catcher Ted Simmons is next on the list in 12th place, with 15,692.1 innings. The top catcher for innings is Iván Rodríguez, with 20,347.1 innings. Greg Garcia had his first career multi-homer day with two, plus a double, giving him 10 total bases, another career high. He had two home runs in 133 at-bats in 2017.

Jedd Gyorko and Luke Gregerson were activated from the DL on April 16, before the night's postponed game at Wrigley Field, that was to be nationally televised on ESPN. Mike Mayers and Yairo Munoz were optioned to AAA-Memphis.

RH-hitting OF Tyler O'Neill, 22, the #4 prospect for the Cardinals , was promoted to the majors before the April 19 game. John Brebbia was optioned to AAA. O'Neill enjoyed a torrid start at Memphis, which owns one of the best records in the Pacific Coast League. He hit .246/.321/.499 with 31 home runs in his first season at Triple-A in 2017. O'Neill is tied for the Minor League league in home runs with six, and presently hitting .388/.385/.837 with 18 RBIs across 12 games. Oblique and hamstring injuries limited O'Neill to just 12 at bats in Grapefruit League play this spring. He might be the strongest man in baseball, squatting . He is the sixth Canadian-born (Burnaby, British Columbia) player currently on a big league roster, joining Nick Pivetta, Russell Martin, Joey Votto, James Paxton and John Axford. He made his major league debut later that day, striking out in his one at-bat as a pinch-hitter.

Reliever Jordan Hicks got his first career win, pitching 2.1 innings, with a game-ending double play with the bases jammed on April 21, the team's sixth win in six games against Cincinnati this season, and the 10th consecutive win against the NL Central's last-place team, MLBs worst team, now 3–17 (.150). The last two losses by the Reds came after their previous manager, Bryan Price was dismissed after their April 18 loss in a dismal 3–15 start, in favor of interim manager Jim Riggleman. Price was 279–387 with the Reds in his five years as manager.

Adam Wainwright, 36, goes on the DL for the second time this season on April 22 (retroactive to April 20), with a right elbow inflammation. He has a history of elbow issues. He is 1–2, with a 3.45 ERA. He was scheduled to start on April 24, but with the team enjoying off-days on April 23 and April 30, reliever John Brebbia was recalled, team can get by with four starters.

Jedd Gyorko hit his 100th career home run, and reliever John Brebbia got his first save in the 9–1 win against the New York Mets on April 25.

For the month of APRIL, the club was 15–10 (.600), scoring 120 runs, giving up 86 in the 25 games, but ending the month on a three-game losing streak (at Pittsburgh) that dropped them out of first place in the NL Central, now in fourth place. For the season they are 15–12 (.556)  games out of first, with Chicago in first, followed by Pittsburgh ( game behind), and Milwaukee (1.0 game behind) ahead of them'. For 2018, scored 126 runs, giving up 101 in their 27 games.

May
Manager Mike Matheny managed his 1,000th game on May 1, joining Tony La Russa, Red Schoendienst, and Whitey Herzog as managers of the Cardinals. Matheny's .560 winning percentage is the best of the four through 1,000 games, and the fifth-best in MLB since 1976. Matt Carpenter helped Matheny celebrate with his 100th career home run in the ninth, tying the game, leading to a win later that inning. Carpenter was hitting .155/.305/.274 going into the game.

The game after Matheny's 1,000th, Yadier Molina on May 2, passed Johnny Bench with his 1,743rd game catching, 16th all-time on the MLB catcher's list. Molina got the walk-off hit to win the May 1 game. He passed Bench on the career innings-caught list in April. In that May 2 game, starter Carlos Martinez hit his first career home run in the sixth inning, giving the team a 1–0 lead. It was only his seventh extra-base hit (six doubles) in a previous 227 plate appearances. He had not hit a batter for the first time this season, and for the first time in eight starts dating back to last year. The seven-game streak with at least one hit batsman tied for the third longest in baseball history. He earned his third win against one loss in seven starts, with a 1.40 ERA. In the next inning, Dexter Fowler hit a two-run home run, giving them a 3–0 lead that held up for a 3–2 win. It was his career 100th home run. He was hitting .161 before that at-bat.

Relievers Sam Tuivailala (R) and Ryan Sherriff (L) were both activated from the DL before the May 4 game. Austin Gomber (P) and Luke Voit (1B) were optioned to AAA.

A few minutes after the end of the May 4 game, former Cardinals' superstar Albert Pujols, 38, playing 1B, became the 32nd major leaguer to get to the coveted 3,000 hit level with his Los Angeles Angels, against the home Seattle Mariners. He lined out in the first, walked and scored in the fourth, and got his 3,000th on a line drive single to right field in the fifth inning off former Cardinals' starter Mike Leake. He later added another hit for 3,001 surpassing the late Roberto Clemente (who was also 38 in his 3,000th and last hit of his career in 1972), for 31st place with his 33rd hit (129 AB) of 2018 in his 31st game. Pujols got 2,073 hits with the Cardinals (2001–2011), and 928 hits over the past  seasons. His 620 home runs rank seventh all-time. He is now hitting .256/.284/.450 (.733 OPS), with 6 HR, 19 RBI in 2018.

Catcher Yadier Molina had an injury to the groin from a foul tip in the ninth inning of the wild afternoon game on May 5, with the Cardinals winning 8–6 in 10 innings after trailing early 0–4, and then 4–6 in the ninth, for the biggest comeback of the season. He underwent surgery that evening, and is expected to miss a month. He was hitting .272/.292/.456 (.748 OPS), with six home runs and 17 RBIs. It was revealed the following day that Molina had a traumatic hematoma that needed immediate medical help. He was placed on the DL and Carson Kelly, 23, was recalled from Memphis. Dominic Leone (RH) reliever injured his right bicep and was also placed on the DL, with Mike Mayers recalled.

Going for the sweep in the nationally televised ESPN game on May 6, they did it with their second consecutive extra-inning win after trailing in their half of the inning, with a two-run home run. This night in a 14-inning 4–3 victory that featured a 30-minute rain delay in the first inning, and a 29-minute rain delay with the team batting in the third inning of the official 4:46 contest. Kolten Wong hit the first triple in the season after 31 games for the team without one, that tied the game at 2-all in the sixth inning. They were the last team in the majors to have a triple. After the Cubs went ahead in the 14th 3–2 with a home run, the Cardinals stormed back in the bottom half after two outs, with an infield single by Harrison Bader, followed by a two-strike game-winning home run by the .156 hitting former Cub Dexter Fowler, who was 0-for-5 before the hit, to complete the sweep and their fifth consecutive win; still unbeaten in May.

Former Cardinals' outfielder Stephen Piscotty received condolences from MLB, his former team, and his current team (Oakland A's) after his mother Gretchen died of ALS on Sunday, May 6, at 55. The Cardinals traded Piscotty this past off-season in part so he could be closer to his family and help care for his mother, who was diagnosed with ALS in May 2017. The trade meant Piscotty would play home games just a short drive from his hometown of Pleasanton, California.

Ace starter Carlos Martinez was placed on the DL with a right lat strain, on May 10. Martinez was leading the NL with a 1.62 ERA, and led the Cardinals with 50 innings and 47 strikeouts. Mike Mayers was recalled.

On May 11, the Cardinals activated Brett Cecil (LH) reliever from the DL, and placed Tyler Lyons (LH) reliever on the DL (retroactive to May 9) with a mid back strain. Lyons co-leads the team with 18 relief appearances, having a 1–0 record and 6.17 ERA.

A season-high five home runs (13 hits) against San Diego (now 14–26, .350 last in NL West) on May 11, in a 9–5 win, was the most for the Cardinals since June 16, 2017 against Baltimore. The three home runs in one inning (3rd) was the first time since April 6, 2012, with Carlos Beltran, Matt Holliday, and David Freese. The five home runs were by, in order: Paul DeJong (3-run HR, 2nd inn.), Harrison Bader (3rd inn.), Marcell Ozuna (3rd inn.), Jedd Gyorko (3rd inn., and his 8th in 12 games against S.D.), and Tommy Pham (2-run HR, 6th inn.). Gyorko was a former Padre, and is now batting .525 (21-for-40), prior to this game at .500, against his former team. Gyorko has 19 RBIs against his former team, and is being paid $2.5 million by the Padres. Petco Park had a very low HR index of 81, Batting Average of 92, and Runs at 83, in 2017, compared to the average NL park of 100. Busch Stadium's index numbers in 2017 were: 86 (HR), 99 (BA), and 89 (R).

Adam Wainwright was activated from the DL on May 13 after missing 17 games (4 starts) with elbow inflammation. John Brebbia was optioned.

For the third time in less than two months, Adam Wainwright, 36, was placed on the DL, the second time with right elbow inflammation, on May 15. He pitched  IP with a career-high six walks, and three hits on May 13. Jack Flaherty, 22, was recalled to start on May 15.

RH-reliever Luke Gregerson has a right shoulder impingement, placing him on the DL before the May 16 afternoon game. He pitched  IP the night before, giving up two runs. John Brebbia was recalled.
 
Former Cardinals' starter Lance Lynn, 31 on May 12 (wearing uniform #31), makes a start on May 16 against his former team, for the Minnesota Twins (AL), at Target Field. Lynn is 1–3, with a 7.34 ERA, in seven starts (164 batters faced), giving up 43 hits (6 HR), 25 walks, and 36 strikeouts in  innings for a 1.98 WHIP. Batters are hitting .312/.415/.522 (.936 OPS) against him. He is 6' 5" and 280 pounds. The Cardinals beat their former teammate, 7–5, with Lynn only pitching three innings, giving up four hits and three runs. He walked four and struck out five. His ERA is now 7.47 with a 1–4 record. At the one-quarter mark for 2018, the team is 23–17 (.575), third place in the NL Central, one game behind Pittsburgh (25–17, .595) and Milwaukee (26–18, .591) tied for first, with the Cubs at 22–18 (.550), two games behind. Cincinnati is far behind in fifth place 15–29 (.341).

Another player goes on the disabled list: Carson Kelly (C) was the one on May 17, with a right hamstring strain. AAA-Memphis catcher Steven Baron, 27, was recalled. To make room for Baron on the 40-man roster, Adam Wainwright was moved to the 60-day DL, with more tests planned after a number of them failed to reveal the source of pain in his reconstructed right elbow,. Kelly, 23, is 2-for-18 (.111) with one RBI at the plate in eight games. He joins seven other Cardinals on the DL, four others and Kelly in the past week. Baron signed as a Minor League free agent in December 2017, and returns the Majors for the first time since he appeared in four games for the Mariners in 2015. In 2018 at Memphis, he was hitting .153/.167/.186 with two doubles and two RBIs in 17 games.

May 18 saw two more Cardinals added to the long disabled list. Matt Bowman (RHP) has blisters on his right index and middle fingers. Paul DeJong (SS) has a fractured left hand after hit by a pitch in the eighth inning of the previous night's game. Yairo Munoz (INF) and Tyler O'Neill (OF) were recalled. The team now has 10 players on the disabled list.

A season-high 15 hits, and second-highest 12 runs in a 1-hour 35-minute rain delayed game, led to a 12–4 win over the Philadelphia Phillies, May 18. Rookie OF'er Tyler O'Neill got his first major league hit. Starter Michael Wacha got his fifth win, tying him with Miles Mikolas for the team lead.

Jack Flaherty, 22, was dominant in a 13-strikeout performance in  innings in a 5–1 win at Busch Stadium on a May 20 afternoon game. He gave up only two hits, including a home run in the fourth inning, walking only one. He allowed only three baserunners in 26 batters faced, a personal high of 120 pitches; 80 for strikes. It was his first major league win, after a 0–1 start over three previous starts totaling  innings and 14 strikeouts. His ERA dropped to 2.31 and his WHIP from 1.34 to 1.03 leading all Cardinals' starters along with his 10.4 K's per nine. OF'er Tyler O'Neill hit his second home run in as many days, his first career home run in the May 19 game. Flaherty also got his first major league hit, a single in the third inning. His 13 strikeouts were the most since Carlos Martinez struck out the same number on Aug. 29, 2016. The 13 K's also were the most ever by a Cardinals' pitcher in his first 10 games, and the most this year.

Another highlight occurred in the ninth inning of that May 20 game, when reliever Jordan Hicks, 21, fired off the five fastest pitches of any pitcher in 2018. His sinker was recorded as high as 105 mph, passing Aroldis Chapman of the New York Yankees. In the previous May 19 game, he hit 103 on the radar gun for his fastest recorded pitch. Hicks owns eight of the 10 fastest pitches, and 13 of the top 20 this year. He and Chapman are the only two pitchers to hit 105 mph since Statcast began tracking pitches in 2008. Hicks twice hit 105 mph in that ninth inning against the one opposing hitter.

The next game, against the cross-state Kansas City Royals on May 21, brought the team its first complete game, shutout of the season. Miles Mikolas went the full nine innings, giving up only four hits, walking one, striking out nine, in facing only 31 batters. He remains perfect at 6–0. It was his first major-league complete game and shutout. Playing in RF, Tyler O'Neill continued his hot hitting, complementing Mikolas' strong pitching. O'Neill hit his third home run in as many games, a three-run blast, and later added a double, driving in his fourth run of the night. He was 2-for-4, hitting .368/.409/.895 (7-for-19, one double, one walk, one hit-by-pitch, five strikeouts, and a sacrifice fly, five runs scored), for a terrific 1.304 OPS, with seven RBIs in only his 10th major league game. Matt Carpenter continued his breakout at-bats in the last six games from a season-long slump, going 3-for-4, including a double and his fourth home run. He is now hitting .210 with a .722 OPS after hitting a career low .140 after his first 39 games. Marcell Ozuna had the other RBI in the game, in a 2-for-3 night; now hitting .241 with a .607 OPS. Carpenter has hit 13-for-24 (.542) in his last six games including seven doubles and his fourth home run.

In a good news report for the Cardinals #1 prospect on May 21, it was decided that disabled pitcher Alex Reyes will join the starting rotation instead of going to the bullpen, when he comes off the 60-day list on May 28. He has had three rehabilitation assignments, with his final fourth scheduled for May 24, at AAA-Memphis. He will be prepped to possibly start the May 29 game against the Milwaukee Brewers at their home park. He enjoyed great success in his previous assignment, going  innings at AA-Springfield, striking out 12. His final rehab start at AAA-Memphis on May 24, resulted in 13 strikeouts, including nine consecutively, in the win after 7 innings and 90 pitches, giving up only one hit, no runs, and two baserunners. He threw 23 scoreless innings across four rehab starts at four different levels. He struck out 44 and walked seven (82 batters faced), going 3–0. Reyes' major league start will be his first since Sept. 29, 2016. He went 4–1 with a 1.57 ERA in 12 appearances (five starts) in 2016, before injuring his right elbow in the spring of 2017. When Carlos Martinez returns from the DL, the team will have three high-powered arms: Reyes, Jack Flaherty, and Luke Weaver, fighting for two spots. Reyes, 23, will make his return start on Wednesday, May 30, the final series game against the Milwaukee Brewers, another team fighting for first-place in the NL Central. That game is televised only to active Facebook users, with no other networks allowed. The Cardinals are not planning any special restrictions on Reyes compared to any other of their pitchers. In delaying his return to the end of May by placing him on the 60-day DL, the club doesn't foresee having to shut him down for the post-season, if the Cardinals were to get there.

Carson Kelly (C) and LH-reliever Tyler Lyons are activated from the DL before the afternoon May 26 game at Pittsburgh. Reliever Greg Holland was placed on the DL with a right hip impingement. Steven Baron (C) was optioned to AAA.

Alex Reyes, 23, returned to the active roster after missing all 52 games played while on the 60-day DL until his May 30 activation and starter against the NL Central Division leading Milwaukee Brewers. Dominic Leone (RH-reliever) was moved to the 60-day DL to make room on the 40-man roster, while Mike Mayers was optioned to make room on the 25-man roster. The 12:10pm game is not on any television network, only viewed on the Facebook platform, for the second time this season, on April 11, also against the Brewers. It is broadcast on KMOX radio, the flagship station. His first game back from Tommy John surgery did not go as expected. He was removed after only four innings, facing 15 batters in throwing only 73 pitches. He gave up no runs, but walked two and gave up three hits, striking out two. He was removed for a pinch-hitter in the fifth inning, with the team suffering the second loss in three games to the NL Central Division leaders (36–21), now trailing them by five games; three on the loss side at 29–24.

After pitching his four innings, Reyes was again placed on the DL (10-day) the next day, May 31, with a right lat strain. LH-reliever Austin Gomber, 24, was recalled. He was 4–3 with a 3.60 ERA in nine starts at AAA-Memphis. He was Pacific Coast League Pitcher of the Week last week. John Gant (P) and Tyler O'Neill (OF) were optioned, with Mike Mayers (P) recalled, as was !B Luke Voit. Voit was batting .237 with one homer and 12 RBIs in 34 games.

The Cardinals placed more players on the DL in May than any of the other 29 major league teams, with 11. The New York Mets placed eight, and the Detroit Tigers (AL) placed seven.

For the month of MAY, the club was 15–12 (.556), scoring 111 runs, giving up 111 in the 27 games, but ending the month on a thrilling, rare, come-from-behind (5 runs) win in the ninth, 10–8 at home against Pittsburgh. Exactly after rd of the season, they are 30–24 (.556)  games out of first, with Milwaukee in first (36–21), followed by Chicago 4 games behind (30–23), and then the Cardinals, with Pittsburgh  games behind (29–27), and Cincinnati 16 games back (20–37). For 2018, scored 237 runs, giving up 212 in their 54 games.

June
Austin Gomber (LH-reliever), 24, made his major league debut on June 2, pitching three scoreless innings (sixth-through-eighth) giving up no hits, walking one, striking out two and inducing a double play. Kolten Wong hit his second walk-off HR of the year, to lead the team to a 3–2 win over the Pirates, who hold a 5–4 advantage with the fourth game of the weekend (Th.-Sun.) on June 3, out of 19 head-to-head. Marcell Ozuna hit his 100th career home run, fourth of the season, and first as a Cardinal at Busch Stadium. The Cardinals lead the majors in 2018 with seven walk-off wins, with five of them via the home run. The game also marked the 1,000th game at this Busch Stadium III since its opening in 2006. The Cardinals are 590–410 at home in that span, with their .590 home winning percentage ranking third behind only the L.A. Dodgers and N.Y. Yankees since 2006.

Michael Wacha pitched eight scoreless no-hit innings at Busch Stadium on June 3, against the Pirates in the finale of their four-game set, taking three of four. Wacha's bid for a no-hitter was broken up by a pinch-hit single in the ninth, the 27th batter Wacha faced. Wacha gave up two earlier walks, striking out eight, throwing 111 pitches (74 strikes), now 7–1, 2.41 ERA. He was relieved by Jordan Hicks for the three outs to finish a team shutout, 5–0, with Marcell Ozuna's first-inning grand slam giving Wacha all the runs he would need. In 2013 (Sep. 24) as a 22-year-old rookie, he came within an out of no-hitting the Washington Nationals. The last Cardinals' no-hitter was September 3, 2001, by Bud Smith against the San Diego Padres.

June 5, gave the team its star pitcher Carlos Martinez, and its star catcher Yadier Molina from the disabled list. Other roster changes include optioning reliever Mike Mayers, placing INF Greg Garcia on the paternity list, DFA backup catcher Steven Baron, and purchasing the contract of RH-reliever Preston Guilmet from AAA-Memphis.

Alex Reyes underwent season-ending surgery to reattach a tendon in his right lat on June 6. He pitched four innings and 73 pitches on May 30 before being removed. LH-reliever Ryan Sherriff also underwent Tommy John surgery on June 5, losing him for the remainder of the season. He made five appearances with the team in 2018, allowing four runs over  innings of relief.

Albert Fred "Red" Schoendienst, wore the Cardinals' uniform longer than anybody else in the franchise's long and storied history, 67 years, with a total of 76 years in professional baseball in 2018. He died at his home in Town and Country, Missouri on June 6, 2018, at 95. The Germantown, Illinois native was part of baseball as a player (1945–56, 1961–63), coach (1964, 1979–95), manager (1965–76) and interim manager (1980, 1990) had been in his current executive role with the team since 1996. He was the oldest living member of the National Baseball Hall of Fame, inducted in 1989.

LH-reliever Tyler Lyons was placed on the DL with a left elbow strain, June 8, and recalled Mike Mayers for the sixth time.

Daniel Poncedeleon (RH-starter) 26, is recalled, after a shocking fractured skull in May 2017 at AAA-Memphis from a line drive that hit him in the right temple. He was 5–2, 2.41 ERA with 49 hits, 2 HR, 35 walks, 71 strikeouts in 12 games (11 starts) for a 1.41 WHIP and .222 O-BA over  IP. He will become the fifth player to make his MLB debut for the Cardinals this season and the 23rd pitcher summoned to St. Louis. In 2017, the team used 25 pitchers in the season. Luke Voit (1B) optioned.

Red Schoendienst, will have his public funeral mass on Friday, June 15, at Cathedral Basilica of St. Louis, at 10am. It will be broadcast on KPLR-TV11. The Cardinals most consistent hitter, #3 in the lineup José Martínez will be on the paternity list, fly to his native Venezuela, and will miss the three-game weekend series with the Cubs (June 15–17) to attend the birth of his second child. He is hitting 322/.391/.522 with 10 HR and 42 RBIs. Luke Voit will replace him at 1B. Red Schoendienst's life was celebrated at a two-hour Mass, with eulogies given by owner Bill DeWitt Jr., broadcaster and player for Red, Mike Shannon, Hall of Fame president Jeff Idelson, and Red's daughter Colleen.

Matt Bowman was activated before the critical three-game Cubs series on June 15, restoring the full 25-man active roster. He missed 25 games since May 18. Daniel Poncedeleon was optioned, without getting into any games of the three while on the active roster.

Yadier Molina tied Gabby Hartnett's record of 1,756 games caught for one team on June 17. Hartnett played 19 years, Molina is in his 15th year. John Brebbia recorded his first major league win, salvaging the ESPN-televised final game (5–0) of the three with the Cubs (40–28). The Cardinals (37–32) are  games behind them for second, with Milwaukee  game ahead (42–29) in the Central Division. He set the major league record of 1,757 games caught for one team in the next game, June 18, and will continue to add for each game caught for the Cardinals until his expected retirement after the 2020 season.

Marcell Ozuna, 27, was named NL Player of the Week for the week of June 11–17. Ozuna hit .455/.478/1.000 (10-for-22, 1.478 OPS) with four home runs and eight RBIs in six games last week, raising his average from .282 to .294. He hit .260/.308/.337 (.645 OPS) with three home runs in the first two months of the season (50 games), and he is slashing .411/.450/.821 (1.271 OPS) with seven homers through 15 games in June.

A franchise record 19 strikeouts for Cardinals' batters was one reason for a frustrating 5–6 loss in 10-inn. at Philadelphia on June 18, after fighting back to a 5–4 lead in the top of the 10th until 2-outs in the bottom of that inning. Miles Mikolas started the game, and after the first inning, trailed 0–4, with the Cardinals striking out during the game at a rate rarely seen in their 126-year NL history. The team trailed with 2-outs in the top of the 9th with a runner on third base, when a third strike on Yairo Munoz eluded the Phillies' catcher, allowing Yadier Molina to score and the Cardinals to tie it at 4–4. They went ahead in the 10th from a solo Tommy Pham home run, happily setting up for a remarkable come-from-behind win in the bottom half. But reliever Matt Bowman could not get the third out after issuing a hit, and then after an out moved him to second, manager Matheny ordered an intentional walk to their best hitter, Carlos Santana. The next batter made the second out, but Aaron Altherr delivered the crushing blow: a sinking, game-winning double to left that Marcell Ozuna came within inches of catching in a dive for it that would have ended the game in a 5–4 win for the Birds. Ozuna later said he would have caught it if it hadn't sunk at the last moment. Statcast said he had only a 4% chance of catching it, having to cover 47 feet toward the left-field line in only 3.1 seconds. It was the Cardnals' fifth loss in six games.

Matt Bowman was placed back on the DL with blisters on his middle finger June 19, only four days after re-activated from the DL due to blistering. Greg Holland was activated from the DL to take his place.

In the June 20 game, Michael Wacha strained his left oblique in the fourth inning at Philadelphia. He is likely headed to the disabled list. He was off to the best start of his career as he entered the day 8–2 with a 3.24 ERA. He was added to the DL on June 21. John Gant, 25, was recalled for the third time. he is 5–1, 1.65 ERA, with 42 strikeouts in 49 IP in eight starts at AAA-Memphis.

John Gant, replacing the injured Michael Wacha in the rotation, threw a one-hit shutout for seven innings against the AL Cleveland Indians on June 25, after a 1-hour 21-min rain delay. Gant gave up the strange infield hit when the ground ball in the second inning hit the third base bag, bouncing high in the air, making a throw to first impossible to retire the batter. Bud Norris got his 15th save. The 4–0 win, the team's third consecutive, snapped the Indians' seven-game winning streak who outscored their opponents 54–9 in those games. Their 41st win (36 losses) also was significant as the 10,000th NL win for the Cardinals in their 127 years in that league's play, becoming the sixth team to do so. Gant had only one win of the previous 9,999 until his brilliant second win. The franchise is credited with 10,780 total wins counting the 10 years 1882–1891 in the American Association league, joining the NL in 1892. The other NL teams are the Atlanta Braves, Chicago Cubs, San Francisco Giants, Pittsburgh Pirates, and Los Angeles Dodgers. Since joining the NL in 1892, only the Giants, Dodgers, and Yankees have won more games.

Matt Carpenter, had a career night in a five-for-five game with three RBIs on June 26. The team had to endure another rain delay: this delay was five minutes longer than last night's game, 1-hour 26-minutes, but buried the Indians in an 11–2 rout, with 13 hits, for the team's fourth straight win (42–36). Cleveland's ace Corey Kluber suffered the shortest start of his career in 1.2 innings, giving up six runs, six hits including two home runs. He is now 11–4 in 2018. Jose Martinez hit a three-run home run to end Kluber's night to highlight a five-run second inning, that boosted them to a 6–2 lead they would not relinquish. Carpenter's night included two singles, a double, and bookend home runs in the first and eighth innings. His leadoff home run was the 18th of his career, trailing only Lou Brock's 21 in Cardinals' history. it was his second career five-for-five game, and he became the first Cardinals' player to have five hits, five runs, and two home runs in a game. For the month of June over the past 20 games, he has eight home runs, scored 22, with 15 RBIs, and jumped his average from .140 to .259.

On June 29, the Cardinals claimed LH-reliever, Tyler Webb, 27, off-waivers from the San Diego Padres. Webb has been assigned to AAA-Memphis. To make room for him on the 40-man roster, Alex Reyes was transferred to the 60-day disabled list.

For the month of JUNE, the team was 12–15 (.444), scoring 108 runs, giving up 126 in the 27 games. Exactly at the half-way mark of the season (HOME: 23–21, AWAY: 19–18), they are 42–39 (.519)  games out of first, with Milwaukee in first (48–34), followed by Chicago  games behind (46–35), and then the Cardinals, with Pittsburgh 9 games behind (39–43), and Cincinnati  games back (35–48). For 2018, scored 345 runs, giving up 338 in their 81 games.

July
Dexter Fowler was given a three-day paternity leave on July 2, for the impending birth of his second child. Tyler O'Neill was recalled from AAA-Memphis, where he was hitting .304 with 19 home runs and 48 RBIs. With the Cardinals in 2018, he hit .237 with three home runs.

The team acquired Philadelphia Phillies AA-level Elniery Garcia, 23, a lefty starter, for a portion of their $5-million international spending purse on July 5. He is 0–6 with a 6.38 ERA in 10 games (nine starts). In  innings, he's allowed 30 earned runs (and 11 unearned runs) to go with 21 walks against 29 strikeouts. The lefty has also been on and off the disabled list most of the season with foot and leg injuries, presently on the disabled list with turf toe.

Dexter Fowler was activated from his three-day paternity leave on July 5. Matt Bowman was activated from the disabled list, and optioned to AAA-Memphis. Tyler O'Neill was placed on the disabled list with a left groin sprain.

SS Paul DeJong was activated from the disabled list on July 6, after missing 45 games since May 18. RH-reliever Austin Gomber was optioned to AAA-Memphis. RF Harrison Bader and INF-SS Yairo Munoz were kept. Munoz hit in 40 games (32 starts) batting .302/.341/.429. with four home runs, and 19 RBIs.

Starting pitcher Miles Mikolas (10–3, 2.65 ERA as of July 8) was picked to represent the Cardinals for the NL pitching staff in the 2018 All-Star Game on July 17 in Washington, D.C.'s Nationals Park. As he will be starting the Sunday (July 15) prior to the All-Star Game, so by the rules on starting pitchers who pitch that Sunday he will not pitch, taken off the official roster and replaced, but still be invited at Nationals Park for the festivities. This his first official All-Star Game. His wife suddenly went into labor, with twins, earlier than expected, prompting Mikolas to fly to his home in Jupiter, Florida from Washington, D.C. on Monday, July 16, and miss all the All-Star Game festivities.

Catcher Yadier Molina, 35 (36 on July 13) replaces Buster Posey on the July 17 All-Star Game roster, due to Posey's ailing hip. It will be the ninth time Molina has made an All-Star roster. This ties Bob Gibson and Albert Pujols, each of whom earned nine such selections as Cardinals. Only Joe Medwick (10), Red Schoendienst (10), Enos Slaughter (10), Ken Boyer (11), Ozzie Smith (14), and Stan Musial (24) had more. Since his first All-Star selection in 2009, Molina has been left off the NL roster only once. Molina is in the midst of his best offensive season since 2012, when he finished fourth in the NL Most Valuable Player vote. His .500 slugging percentage ranks second-best among NL catchers, and he's tied for the league lead among catchers with 13 home runs. He ranks fourth at his position in both batting average (.279) and RBIs (38).

Luke Gregerson (R) and Tyler Lyons (L) were activated from the DL on July 13. Gregerson missed 52 games, Lyons 31. Starter Luke Weaver and reliever John Brebbia were optioned. With off-days from the All-Star Game, the team won't need five starters until after the break. John Gant shifted from starter to bullpen.

After two consecutive lopsided home losses to the last-place in the Central Division Cincinnati Reds (43–52 .453) dropping the team to 47–46 (.505) in third place, now seven games behind the division leading Cubs (53–38 .582) and second place Milwaukee Brewers (55–42 .567) by six games, with the Pirates right behind them in fourth place at 47–49 (.490), the Cardinals dismissed manager Mike Matheny that July 14 (Saturday) night, the day before the final game before the All-Star break. Also dismissed were hitting coach John Mabry and assistant hitting coach Bill Mueller. Bench coach Mike Shildt will take over as interim manager. Matheny since his hiring, managed from 2012. His record after 1,065 games was 591–474 (.555). His record after the first four years was 375–273 (.579), but these last 2.57 years his record was only 216–201 (.518). The team leads all of MLB with a lowest .978 fielding average, and 75 errors (92 games; now 77, with 2 more in game 93), with the NL team average making 53 errors. The Cardinals announced on its Twitter account an 11am press conference Sunday morning to discuss the firings and further staff changes. At the news conference, chairman Bill DeWitt Jr. said, "it was time for a fresh voice and some new leadership" in dismissing Matheny, Mabry, and Mueller. Mark Budaska, 65, was announced as the new batting coach. Budaska was their hitting coach at AAA-Memphis for years. George Greer, 71, a hitting coordinator in the minors is the new hitting coach.

The new manager, Mike Shildt, 49 (50 on Aug. 9), won his first major league game, 6–4, on July 15 at home. The 45,808 attendance made the Cardinals the second major league team (Los Angeles Dodgers, 2,382,991 in 51 home games) to pass the 2-million tickets sold. They have sold 2,030,250 tickets in 48 home games (24–24; 195 Runs, 206 Runs against), road record is 24–22, 218 Runs, 196 Runs against. Leading off in the game, Matt Carpenter hit his fifth leadoff home run in 2018, second consecutive game hitting a leadoff homer (19th in 2018), with the five in 2018 tying his own Cardinals record from 2015, set by Lou Brock (1967, 1970), and Ray Lankford (1994). It was also Carpenter's 20th leadoff home run of his career, one behind the Cardinals' record of 21, set by Brock.

Miles Mikolas, was placed on the paternity list (Wed.) July 18, up to three days, to attend the birth of twins, with wife Lauren previously saying she was not expecting until September. Reliever Matt Bowman will join the roster until Mikolas returns. Mikolas is scheduled to start the final game of the five-game series in Chicago.

Manager Shildt named Ron "Pop" Warner, 49, as his new bench coach on July 19, replacing himself.

Matt Carpenter tied the Cardinals' franchise record held by Lou Brock, with his 21st lead-off home run on, and 21st for the season on July 20, plus a new franchise record six lead-off HRs in a season. But, he wasn't finished setting records for the game. He hit two more HRs, his 22nd and 23rd, plus two doubles. He became the first Cardinals' player and only the second in MLB history (the Cubs' Kris Bryant) to have three HRs and two doubles in a game, going 5–for–5 and doing it all by the first six innings, in an 18–5 thrashing of the Cubs at Wrigley Field. He scored four runs with a career–high seven RBIs, and tied a franchise–record 16 total bases, surpassing Albert Pujols' 15, set on this same date 14 years ago (2004). The co–holder with 16 total bases is Mark Whiten with his MLB–record 4 HRs on September 7, 1993. Carpenter set an MLB record with the five extra–base hits in the first six innings of a game. His averages jumped from .262/.371/.532 and .904 OPS to .274/.381/.576 and .958 OPS. The team hit a season–high with the 18 runs, and the same for the 18 hits. The 18 hits included five doubles and five HRs. He started his first 140 plate appearances hitting a weak .140/.286/.272 and .558 OPS. Since then, Carpenter has pulled his season OPS up to .958 by hitting .346/.435/.738. The 18 runs scored has not been done by the Cardinals since August 22, 2008. Box Score: Cardinals 18, Cubs 5

Before the third game against the Cubs on July 21, the Cardinals placed Carlos Martinez on the 10-day DL from a right oblique strain (backdated to July 20), from the last inning of his July 19 start. Recalled John Brebbia, a long reliever. Optioned Matt Bowman. Miles Mikolas activated from the paternity list, and added Luke Weaver as the 26th man for the doubleheader that day.

Matt Carpenter becomes the first Cardinal player, and 28th in MLB history to hit a HR in six consecutive games in the same season, with one in each of the July 21 doubleheader games at Wrigley Field. He also became the only player to hit six HRs in a series at that stadium. He has hit eight HRs in 12 games against the Cubs in 2018, and the first Cardinal to have 12 consecutive hits go for extra bases. He has slugged .761 and 1.202 OPS over his past 58 games, and credits his secret salsa recipe for his resurgence. The record for consecutive HR games is eight, held by Dale Long, Don Mattingly, and Ken Griffey Jr.

The St. Louis market is #1 nationally among individual teams' local telecast ratings, and again had a strong performance in viewers for the 2018 All-Star Game and Home Run Derby. St. Louis ranked second for Fox's telecast of the game (KTVI, Channel 2), and tied for 10th for the Derby (on ESPN). It marked at least the 17th consecutive year that St. Louis has outperformed the national average—often by a significant amount. Ratings for the events are readily available dating to 2002. Nationally, the All-Star Game received a 5.2 rating, while in St. Louis it got double, a 10.3. The HR Derby got 3.2 nationally, but 4.9 in St. Louis.

Matt Carpenter became the second Cardinals' player in 2018 to be named the NL Player of the Week on July 23, for the shortened week July 19–22 (All-Star Game break), hitting .529/.620/1.706 (2.325 OPS), with his 9–for–17 performance in 5 games, including 2 Doubles, 6 HRs, 3 Walks, 8 Runs, and 10 RBIs.

Daniel Poncedeleon (RHP), 26, made his major league debut after his recall on July 23. His start comes less than 15 months since having emergency brain surgery after being hit with a comebacker on the forehead at AAA–Memphis. He became one of the best PCL starters, at 9–3, 2.15 ERA in 18 games (17 starts). Kolten Wong goes on the disabled list with a left knee inflammation. He pitched seven scoreless and hitless innings, before lifted after throwing 116 pitches (75 strikes), facing 24 batters with six groundouts and the same for flyouts. He walked three, with three strikeouts. He became the fifth pitcher to carry a no–hitter through seven innings in his MLB debut in the Expansion Era (1962), coming all the way back from his near–fatal head injury in May 2017. Leaving with a 1–0 lead, the Cardinals got through the eighth inning, but closer Bud Norris gave up a game–tying home run with two outs in the ninth, and lost the game 1–2 later that inning at Cincinnati's Great American Ball Park. Box Score

After 100 games played with the loss on July 23, the Cardinals fell to 50–50 (.500), with 24–24 at home and 26–26 on the road. Now in fourth place in the NL Central,  games behind the Cubs, and  games behind the Pittsburgh Pirates in third place.

The day after starter Daniel Poncedeleon made his dazzling MLB debut, he was optioned to AAA on July 24, so that lefty starter Austin Gomber can be recalled and make his first major league start. Gomber is 0–0, 3.77 ERA in 15 appearances (14.1 IP, 11 hits, 1 HR, 8 walks, 2 hit batters, 10 strikeouts, a .233 Opp–BA, 1.33 WHIP in 59 batters faced) as a reliever this year, and was 7–3, 3.42 ERA in 12 games (11 starts) at AAA–Memphis. The Cardinals' relief corps has allowed 21 runs in six games since the All-Star break, a 2–4 stretch pushing them down to .500 and fourth place in the NL Central.

Schedule and results
Regular Season Schedule (calendar style) 
Regular Season Schedule (sortable text) 
National Broadcast Schedule (all teams), EDT

Most games are broadcast on Fox Sports Midwest, unless noted on the game dates. 
The April 11 home game against the Brewers has the distinction of one of 25 weekday afternoon games with a video broadcast only on Facebook Watch. The Cardinals won't be allowed to broadcast the game on Fox Sports Midwest. Facebook said on March 9, that recorded broadcasts also will be available globally, excluding select international markets. The away game against the Brewers on May 30, is also an exclusive Facebook broadcast.

Game log

Legend:       = Win       = Loss       = PostponementBold = Cardinals player

|- bgcolor= ffbbbb 
| 1 || March 29 || @Mets || 4–9 || Syndergaard (1–0) || Martinez (0–1) || || 44,189 || 0–1 || 0–1
|- bgcolor=ffbbbb
| 2 || March 31 || @Mets || 2–6 || deGrom (1–0) || Wacha (0–1) || Familia (1) || 36,098 || 0–2 || 0–2 
|-

|- bgcolor=ccffcc 
| 3 || April 1 || @Mets || 5–1 || Weaver (1–0) || Matz (0–1) || || 22,486 || 1–2 || 1–2
|-bgcolor=ccffcc
| 4 || April 2 || @Brewers || 8–4 || Mikolas (1–0) || Davies (0–1) || || 45,393 || 2–2 || 2–2
|-bgcolor=ffbbbb
| 5 || April 3 || @Brewers || 4–5 || Jennings (1–0) || Leone (0–1) || || 27,760 || 2–3 || 2–3
|-bgcolor=ccffcc
| 6 || April 4 || @Brewers (FS1) || 6–0 || Martinez (1–1) || Chacin (0–1) || || 27,674 || 3–3 || 3–3
|-bgcolor=ffbbbb
| 7 || April 5 || Diamondbacks || 1–3 || Ray (2–0) || Wainwright (0–1) || Boxberger (3) || 46,512 || 3–4 || 3–4
|-bgcolor=ccffcc
| 8 || April 7 || Diamondbacks || 5–3 || Wacha (1–1) || Greinke (0–1) || Norris (1) || 41,113 || 4–4 || 4–4
|-bgcolor=ffbbbb
| 9 || April 8 || Diamondbacks || 1–4 || Hirano (1–0) || Leone (0–2) || Boxberger (4) || 40,468 || 4–5 || 4–5
|-bgcolor=ffbbbb
| 10 || April 9 || Brewers (ESPN) || 4–5 (10) || Albers (2–0) || Holland (0–1) || || 35,189 || 4–6 || 4–6
|-bgcolor=ccffcc
| 11 || April 10 || Brewers || 5–3 (11) || Leone (1–2) || Hoover (0–1) || || 35,220 || 5–6 || 5–5
|-bgcolor=ffbbbb
| 12 || April 11 || Brewers (Facebook) || 2–3 || Guerra (1–0) || Wainwright (0–2) || Albers (1) || 35,814 || 5–7 || 5–5
|-bgcolor=ccffcc
| 13 || April 12 || @Reds || 13–4 || Wacha (2–1) || Brice (0–2) || Mayers (1) || 11,128 || 6–7 || 5–5
|-bgcolor=ccffcc
| 14 || April 13 || @Reds || 5–3 || Weaver (2–0) || Mahle (1–2) || Norris (2) || 19,561 || 7–7 ||5–5
|-bgcolor=ccffcc
| 15 || April 14 || @Reds || 6–1 || Mikolas (2–0) || Finnegan (0–1) || || 19,213 || 8–7 || 6–4
|-bgcolor=ccffcc
| 16 || April 15 || @Reds || 3–2 || Martinez (2–1) || Bailey (0–3) || Norris (3) || 15,557 || 9–7 || 6–4
|-bgcolor=bbbbbb
| – || April 16 || @Cubs (ESPN) || colspan="7" | Postponed (inclement weather) (Makeup date: July 21, 1st G) 
|-bgcolor=ccffcc
| 17 || April 17 || @Cubs || 5–3 || Wainwright (1–2) || Chatwood (0–3) || Norris (4) || 35,103 || 10–7 || 7–3
|-bgcolor=bbbbbb
| – || April 18 || @Cubs || colspan="7" | Postponed (inclement weather) (Makeup date: April 19) 
|-bgcolor=ffbbbb
| 18 || April 19 || @Cubs || 5–8 || Lester (2–0) || Weaver (2–1) || Morrow (3) || 29,648 || 10–8 || 6–4
|-bgcolor=ccffcc
| 19 || April 20 || Reds || 4–2 || Wacha (3–1) || Finnegan (0–2) || Norris (5) || 43,303 || 11–8 || 7–3
|-bgcolor=ccffcc
| 20 || April 21 || Reds || 4–3 || Hicks (1–0) || Hughes (0–2) || || 42,382 || 12–8 || 8–2
|-bgcolor=ccffcc
| 21 || April 22 || Reds || 9–2 || Mikolas (3–0) || Castillo (1–3) || || 44,430 || 13–8 || 8–2
|-bgcolor=ffbbbb
| 22 || April 24 || Mets || 5–6 (10) || Gsellman (3–0) || Bowman (0–1) || Familia (9) || 36,237 || 13–9 || 8–2
|-bgcolor=ccffcc
| 23 || April 25 || Mets || 9–1 || Wacha (4–1) || Matz (1–2) || Brebbia (1) || 38,045 || 14–9 || 8–2
|-bgcolor=ccffcc
| 24 || April 26 || Mets || 4–3 (13) || Gant (1–0) || Sewald (0–1) || || 37,762 || 15–9 || 8–2
|-bgcolor=ffbbbb
| 25 || April 27 || @Pirates || 5–6 (11) || Kontos (2–2) || Hicks (1–1) || || 15,748 || 15–10 || 7–3
|-bgcolor=ffbbbb
| 26 || April 28 || @Pirates || 2–6 || Williams (4–1) || Flaherty (0–1) || || 18,568 || 15–11 || 6–4
|-bgcolor=ffbbbb
| 27 || April 29 || @Pirates || 0–5 || Kingham (1–0) || Weaver (2–2) || || 14,378 || 15–12 || 5–5 
|-

|- bgcolor=ccffcc 
| 28 || May 1 || White Sox || 3–2 || Norris (1–0) || Soria (0–1) || || 38,800 || 16–12 || 6–4
|- bgcolor=ccffcc
| 29 || May 2 || White Sox || 3–2 || Martinez (3–1) || Giolito (1–4) || Norris (6) || 37,298 || 17–12 || 6–4
|- bgcolor=ccffcc
| 30 || May 4 || Cubs || 3–2 || Mikolas (4–0) || Quintana (3–2) || Norris (7) || 46,099 || 18–12 || 6–4
|- bgcolor=ccffcc
| 31 || May 5 || Cubs || 8–6 (10) || Lyons (1–0) || Farrell (1–1) || || 47,154 || 19–12 || 6–4
|- bgcolor=ccffcc
| 32 || May 6 || Cubs (ESPN) || 4–3 (14) || Mayers (1–0) || Farrell (1–2) || || 45,438 || 20–12 || 7–3
|- bgcolor=ffbbbb
| 33 || May 7 || Twins || 0–6 || Romero (2–0) || Gant (1–1) || || 40,182 || 20–13 || 6–4
|- bgcolor=ffbbbb
| 34 || May 8 || Twins || 1–7 || Odorizzi (3–2) || Martinez (3–2) || || 39,253 || 20–14 || 5–5
|- bgcolor=ccffcc
| 35 || May 10 || @Padres || 2–1 || Mikolas (5–0) || Lyles (0–1) || Norris (8) || 20,515 || 21–14 || 6–4
|- bgcolor=ccffcc
| 36 || May 11 || @Padres || 9–5 || Weaver (3–2) || Lauer (1–2) || || 28,207 || 22–14 || 7–3
|- bgcolor=ffbbbb
| 37 || May 12 || @Padres || 1–2 (13) || Cimber (2–1) || Brebbia (0–1) || || 32,715 || 22–15 || 7–3
|- bgcolor=ffbbbb
| 38 || May 13 || @Padres || 3–5 || Richard (2–5) || Wainwright (1–3) || Hand (11) || 28,183 || 22–16 || 6–4
|- bgcolor=ffbbbb
| 39 || May 15 || @Twins (FS1) || 1–4 || Berríos (4–4) || Cecil (0–1) || Rodney (8) || 24,259 || 22–17 || 5–5
|- bgcolor=ccffcc
| 40 || May 16 || @Twins || 7–5 || Hicks (2–1) || Lynn (1–4) || Norris (9) || 25,180 || 23–17 || 5–5
|- bgcolor=ffbbbb
| 41 || May 17 || Phillies || 2–6 || Velasquez (4–4) || Weaver (3–3) || || 41,039 || 23–18 || 4–6
|- bgcolor=ccffcc
| 42 || May 18 || Phillies || 12–4 || Wacha (5–1) || Arrieta (3–2) || || 42,050 || 24–18 || 4–6
|- bgcolor=ffbbbb
| 43 || May 19 || Phillies || 6–7 || Hunter (1–0) || Holland (0–2) || Dominguez (1) || 44,431 || 24–19 || 4–6
|- bgcolor=ccffcc
| 44 || May 20 || Phillies || 5–1 || Flaherty (1–1) || Nola (6–2) || || 43,560 || 25–19 || 5–5
|- bgcolor=ccffcc
| 45 || May 21 || Royals || 6–0 || Mikolas (6–0) || Kennedy (1–5) || || 42,140 || 26–19 || 5–5
|- bgcolor=ffbbbb
| 46 || May 22 || Royals || 1–5 || Hammel (1–5) || Weaver (3–4) || || 39,545 || 26–20 || 4–6
|- bgcolor=ffbbbb
| 47 || May 23 || Royals || 2–5 (10) || Boyer (2–0) || Norris (1–1) || Herrera (10) || 41,984 || 26–21 || 4–6
|- bgcolor=ffbbbb
| 48 || May 25 || @Pirates || 1–8 || Musgrove (1–0) || Gant (1–2) || || 22,629 || 26–22 || 4–6
|- bgcolor=ccffcc
| 49 || May 26 || @Pirates || 4–1 || Flaherty (2–1) || Williams (5–3) || Norris (10) || 22,133 || 27–22 || 5–5
|- bgcolor=ccffcc
| 50 || May 27 || @Pirates || 6–4 || Tuivailala (1–0) || Feliz (0–2) || Norris (11) || 19,608 || 28–22 || 5–5
|- bgcolor=ffbbbb
| 51 || May 28 || @Brewers || 3–8 || Suter (5–3) || Weaver (3–5) || || 42,867 || 28–23 || 5–5 
|-bgcolor=ccffcc
| 52 || May 29 || @Brewers || 6–1 || Wacha (6–1) || Davies (2–5) || || 40,982 || 29–23 || 5–5 
|-bgcolor=ffbbbb
| 53 || May 30 || @Brewers (Facebook) || 2–3 || Jeffress (5–0) || Tuivailala (1–1) || Knebel (5) || 33,133 || 29–24 || 5–5 
|-bgcolor=ccffcc
| 54 || May 31 || Pirates || 10–8 || Mayers (2–0) || Vázquez (2–2) || || 40,832 || 30–24 || 5–5 
|-

|-bgcolor=ffbbbb 
| 55 || June 1 || Pirates || 0–4 || Taillon (3–4) || Mikolas (6–1) || || 47,135 || 30–25 || 4–6
|-bgcolor=ccffcc
| 56 || June 2 || Pirates || 3–2 || Norris (2–1) || Rodriguez (1–2) || || 44,492 || 31–25 || 5–5
|-bgcolor=ccffcc
| 57 || June 3 || Pirates || 5–0 || Wacha (7–1) || Kingham (2–2) || || 44,432 || 32–25 || 6–4
|-bgcolor=ffbbbb
| 58 || June 5 || Marlins (FS1) || 4–7 || Ureña (1–7) || Guilmet (0–1) || Barraclough (2) || 40,070 || 32–26 || 6–4
|-bgcolor=ffbbbb
| 59 || June 6 || Marlins || 3–11 || Rucinski (1–0) || Flaherty (2–2) || || 40,109 || 32–27 || 5–5
|-bgcolor=ccffcc
| 60 || June 7 || Marlins || 4–1 || Mikolas (7–1) || Richards (0–3) || Norris (12) || 41,297 || 33–27 || 5–5
|-bgcolor=ccffcc
| 61 || June 8 || @Reds || 7–6 (10) || Norris (3–1) || Iglesias (1–1) || Brebbia (2) || 26,144 || 34–27 || 6–4
|-bgcolor=ccffcc
| 62 || June 9 || @Reds || 6–4 || Wacha (8–1) || Castillo (4–7) || Hicks (1) || 34,469 || 35–27 || 6–4
|-bgcolor=ffbbbb
| 63 || June 10 || @Reds || 3–6 || DeSclafani (1–1) || Martinez (3–3) || Hughes (4) || 19,344 || 35–28 || 6–4
|-bgcolor=ccffcc
| 64 || June 11 || Padres || 5–2 || Flaherty (3–2) || Lyles (2–3) || Norris (13) || 40,971 || 36–28 || 6–4
|-bgcolor=ffbbbb
| 65 || June 12 || Padres || 2–4 || Cimber (3–2) || Mikolas (7–2) || Hand (20) || 40,199 || 36–29 || 6–4
|-bgcolor=ffbbbb
| 66 || June 13 || Padres || 2–4 || Lauer (3–4) || Weaver (3–6) || Hand (21) || 44,094 || 36–30 || 5–5
|-bgcolor=ffbbbb
| 67 || June 15 || Cubs || 5–13 || Lester (8–2) || Wacha (8–2) || || 46,188 || 36–31 || 4–6
|-bgcolor=ffbbbb
| 68 || June 16 || Cubs (Fox) || 3–6 || Hendricks (5–6) || Tuivailala (1–2) || Morrow (16) || 47,168 || 36–32 || 4–6
|-bgcolor=ccffcc
| 69 || June 17 || Cubs (ESPN) || 5–0 || Brebbia (1–1) || Quintana (6–5) || || 46,214 || 37–32 || 5–5
|-bgcolor=ffbbbb
| 70 || June 18 || @Phillies || 5–6 (10) || Thompson (1–0) || Bowman (0–2) || || 22,083 || 37–33 || 4–6
|-bgcolor=ccffcc
| 71 || June 19 || @Phillies || 7–6 || Hicks (3–1) || Dominguez (1–1) || || 21,122 || 38–33 || 4–6
|-bgcolor=ffbbbb
| 72 || June 20 || @Phillies || 3–4 || Ramos (2–0) || Tuivailala (1–3) || Morgan (1) || 26,120 || 38–34 || 3–7
|-bgcolor=ffbbbb
| 73 || June 21 || @Brewers || 3–11 || Suter (8–4) || Martinez (3–4) || || 32,764 || 38–35 || 3–7
|-bgcolor=ffbbbb
| 74 || June 22 || @Brewers || 1–2 || Knebel (1–0) || Norris (3–2) || || 36,275 || 38–36 || 2–8
|-bgcolor=ccffcc
| 75 || June 23 || @Brewers || 3–2 || Mikolas (8–2) || Jeffress (5–1) || Norris (14) || 35,551 || 39–36 || 3–7
|-bgcolor=ccffcc
| 76 || June 24 || @Brewers || 8–2 || Weaver (4–6) || Chacin (6–3) || || 39,710 || 40–36 || 4–6
|-bgcolor=ccffcc
| 77 || June 25 || Indians || 4–0 || Gant (2–2) || Clevinger (6–3) || Norris (15) || 42,007 || 41–36 || 5–5
|-bgcolor=ccffcc
| 78 || June 26 || Indians || 11–2 || Martinez (4–4) || Kluber (11–4) || || 40,288 || 42–36 || 6–4
|-bgcolor=ffbbbb
| 79 || June 27 || Indians || 1–5 || Bieber (3–0) || Flaherty (3–3) || || 43,598 || 42–37 || 5–5
|-bgcolor=ffbbbb
| 80 || June 29 || Braves || 1–5 || Teherán (6–5) || Mikolas (8–3) || Winkler (1) || 46,226 || 42–38 || 5–5
|-bgcolor=ffbbbb
| 81 || June 30 || Braves (Fox) || 4–11 || Fried (1–2) || Weaver (4–7) || || 46,667 || 42–39 || 4–6 
|-

|-bgcolor=ffbbbb 
| 82 || July 1 || Braves || 5–6 || Foltynewicz (6–4) || Gant (2–3) || Minter (3) || 46,448 || 42–40 || 4–6
|-bgcolor=ccffcc
| 83 || July 2 || @Diamondbacks || 6–3 || Martinez (5–4) || Ray (3–1) || Norris (16) || 20,334 || 43–40 || 5–5
|-bgcolor=ffbbbb
| 84 || July 3 || @Diamondbacks || 2–4 || Greinke (9–5) || Flaherty (3–4) || Boxberger (20) || 25,843 || 43–41 || 5–5
|-bgcolor=ccffcc
| 85 || July 4 || @Diamondbacks || 8–4 || Mikolas (9–3) || Hirano (2–1) || || 44,072 || 44–41 || 5–5
|-bgcolor=ccffcc
| 86 || July 5 || @Giants || 11–2 || Weaver (5–7) || Cueto (3–1) || || 38,766 || 45–41 || 5–5
|-bgcolor=ffbbbb
| 87 || July 6 || @Giants || 2–3 || Moronta (5–1) || Brebbia (1–2) || Smith (3) || 37,996 || 45–42 || 4–6
|-bgcolor=ccffcc
| 88 || July 7 || @Giants || 3–2 || Martinez (6–4) || Samardzija (1–5) || Norris (17) || 39,606 || 46–42 || 4–6
|-bgcolor=ffbbbb
| 89 || July 8 || @Giants || 8–13 || Bumgarner (2–3) || Brebbia (1–3) || || 38,855 || 46–43 || 4–6
|-bgcolor=ccffcc
| 90 || July 10 || @White Sox || 14–2 || Mikolas (10–3) || Covey (3–5) || || 23,245 || 47–43 || 5–5
|-bgcolor=ffbbbb
| 91 || July 11 || @White Sox || 0–4 || Rodón (2–3) || Weaver (5–8) || Soria (13) || 26,319 || 47–44 || 5–5
|-bgcolor=ffbbbb
| 92 || July 13 || Reds || 1–9 || Harvey (5–5) || Martinez (6–5) || || 45,891 || 47–45 || 5–5
|-bgcolor=ffbbbb
| 93 || July 14 || Reds || 2–8 || Brice (2–2) || Hicks (3–2) || || 44,668 || 47–46 || 4–6 
|-bgcolor=ccffcc
| 94 || July 15 || Reds || 6–4 || Gant (3–3) || DeSclafani (4–2) || Hicks (2) || 45,808 || 48–46 || 5–5 
| rowspan=3 |ASG || colspan=8 | 89th All-Star Game at Nationals Park in Washington, District of Columbia, United States || rowspan=3 | Box 
|- bgcolor=ffbbbb  
| July 17 || colspan=2 |  NL All-Stars 6, AL All-Stars 8 (10) || Díaz  (SEA) || Stripling (LAD) || Happ (TOR) ||  43,843 ||AL 44–43–2
|- style="text-align:center; bgcolor="bbcaff"
| colspan=8 |Representing the Cardinals: Miles Mikolas and Yadier Molina 
|- bgcolor=ffbbbb
| 95 || July 19 || @Cubs (ESPN) || 6–9 || Duensing (3–0) || Martinez (6–6) || Strop (3) || 41,406 || 48–47 || 4–6
|- bgcolor=ccffcc
| 96 || July 20 || @Cubs || 18–5 || Flaherty (4–4) || Lester (12–3) || || 41,077 || 49–47 || 4–6
|- bgcolor=ffbbbb
| 97 || July 21 || @Cubs || 2–7 || Chatwood (4–5) || Weaver (5–9) || || 41,004 || 49–48 || 4–6
|- bgcolor=ccffcc
| 98 || July 21 || @Cubs (Fox) || 6–3 || Tuivailala (2–3) || Wilson (3–3) || Norris (18) || 41,244 || 50–48 || 4–6
|- bgcolor=ffbbbb
| 99 || July 22 || @Cubs (FSM / TBS) || 2–7 || Quintana (9–6) || Mayers (2–1) || || 39,737 || 50–49 || 4–6
|- bgcolor=ffbbbb
| 100 || July 23 || @Reds || 1–2 || Hughes (3–3) || Norris (3–3) || || 17,518 || 50–50 || 3–7
|- bgcolor=ccffcc
| 101 || July 24 || @Reds || 4–2 (11) || Tuivailala (3–3) || Garrett (0–2) || Norris (19) || 18,379 || 51–50 || 4–6
|- bgcolor=ffbbbb
| 102 || July 25 || @Reds || 3–7 || Romano (6–8) || Flaherty (4–5) || || 20,940 || 51–51 || 4–6
|- bgcolor=ccffcc
| 103 || July 27 || Cubs || 5–2 || Weaver (6–9) || Montgomery (3–4) || || 47,169 || 52–51 || 5–5
|- bgcolor=ccffcc
| 104 || July 28 || Cubs (FS1) || 6–2 || Mikolas (11–3) || Quintana (9–7) || || 47,514 || 53–51 || 5–5
|- bgcolor=ffbbbb
| 105 || July 29 || Cubs (ESPN) || 2–5 || Hendricks (7–9) || Gant (3–4) || Strop (5) || 45,553 || 53–52 || 5–5
|- bgcolor=ccffcc
| 106 || July 30 || Rockies || 5–4 (10) || Hudson (1–0) || McGee (1–4) || || 41,856 || 54–52 || 5–5
|- bgcolor=ffbbbb
| 107 || July 31 || Rockies || 3–6 || Gray (9–7) || Jack Flaherty (4–6) || Davis (31) || 42636 || 54–53 || 5–5
|-

|- bgcolor=ccffcc 
| 108 || August 1 || Rockies || 6–3 || Gomber (1–0) || Freeland (9–7) || || 40,544 || 55–53 || 5–5
|- bgcolor=ccffcc 
| 109 || August 2 || Rockies || 3–2 || Shreve (3–2) || Davis (1–4) || || 41,478 || 56–53 || 6–4 
|- bgcolor=ffbbbb 
| 110 || August 3 || @Pirates || 6–7 || Crick (2–1) || Hicks (3–3) || Vázquez (25) || 26,773|| 56–54 || 6–4
|- bgcolor=ccffcc
| 111 || August 4 || @Pirates || 8–4 || Hudson (2–0) || McRae (0–1) || || 32,473 || 57–54 || 6–4
|- bgcolor=ccffcc
| 112 || August 5 || @Pirates || 2–1 || Flaherty (5–6) || Williams (9–8) || Norris (21) || 19,376|| 58–54 || 7–3
|- bgcolor=ffbbbb
| 113 || August 6 || @Marlins || 2–3 || Chen (4–8) || Weaver (6–10) || Guerra (1) || 8,563 || 58–55 || 6–4
|- bgcolor=ccffcc
| 114 || August 7 || @Marlins || 3–2 || Mikolas (12–3) || Hernández (2–6) || Norris (22) || 7,230 || 59–55 || 6–4
|- bgcolor=ccffcc
| 115 || August 8 || @Marlins || 7–1 || Gant (4–4) || Richards (3–7) || || 7,306 || 60–55 || 7–3
|- bgcolor=ccffcc
| 116 || August 10 || @Royals || 7–0 || Gomber (2–0) || Smith (1–4) || Poncedeleon (1) || 29,414|| 61–55 || 7–3
|- bgcolor=ccffcc
| 117 || August 11 || @Royals || 8–3 || Flaherty (6–6) || Duffy (7–11) || Hicks (3) || 38,427 || 62–55 || 8–2
|- bgcolor=ccffcc
| 118 || August 12 || @Royals || 8–2 || Ross (7–9) || Hammel (2–12) || || 23.409 || 63–55 || 8–2
|- bgcolor=ccffcc
| 119 || August 13 || Nationals || 7–6 || Hudson (3–0) || Glover (0–1) || || 37,197 || 64–55 || 8–2
|- bgcolor=ccffcc
| 120 || August 14 || Nationals || 6–4 || Gant (5–4) || González (7–9) || Hicks (4) || 38,214 || 65–55 || 9–1
|- bgcolor=ccffcc
| 121 || August 15 || Nationals || 4–2 || Gomber (3–0) || Hellickson (5–3) || Norris (23) || 36,696 || 66–55 || 9–1
|- bgcolor=ffbbbb
| 122 || August 16 || Nationals || 4–5 || Roark (8–12) || Weaver (6–11) || Glover (1) || 38,074 || 66–56|| 8–2
|- bgcolor=ccffcc
| 123 || August 17 || Brewers || 5–2 || Flaherty (7–6) || Peralta (5–4) || Norris (24) || 41,630 || 67–56 || 9–1
|- bgcolor=ccffcc
| 124 || August 18 || Brewers (FS1) || 7–2 || Mikolas (13–3) || Miley (2–2) || || 46,040 ||68–56 || 9–1
|- bgcolor=ffbbbb
| 125 || August 19 || Brewers || 1–2 || Chacín (13–4) || Gant (5–5) || Hader (10) || 45,334 ||68–57 || 8–2
|- bgcolor=ccffcc
| 126 || August 20 || @Dodgers || 5–3 || Cecil (1–1) || Jansen (0–4) || Norris (25) || 42,402 || 69–57 || 8–2
|- bgcolor=ccffcc
| 127 || August 21 || @Dodgers || 5–2 || Weaver (7–11) || Ryu (3–1) || Norris (26) || 43,923 || 70–57 || 8–2
|- bgcolor=ccffcc
| 128 || August 22 || @Dodgers || 3–1 || Hudson (4–0) || Jansen (0–5) || Hicks (5) || 48,247 || 71–57 || 8–2
|- bgcolor=ccffcc
| 129 || August 24 || @Rockies || 7–5 || Martinez (7–6) || Senzatela (4–4) || Norris (27) || 43,578 || 72–57 || 8–2
|- bgcolor=ffbbbb
| 130 || August 25 || @Rockies || 1–9 || Ottavino (6–2) || Hudson (4–1) || || 47,785 || 72–58 || 7–3
|- bgcolor=ccffcc
| 131 || August 26 || @Rockies || 12–3 || Gomber (4–0) || Anderson (6–7) || || 41,235 || 73–58 || 7–3
|- bgcolor=ccffcc
| 132 || August 28 || Pirates || 5–2 || Flaherty (8–6) || Nova (7–9) || Norris (28) || 35,258 || 74–58 || 8–2
|- bgcolor= ffbbbb
| 133 || August 29 || Pirates || 0–2 ||Williams (11-9) ||Mikolas (13-4) ||Vázquez (28) || 33,448 || 74–59 || 7–3
|- bgcolor= ccffcc
| 134 || August 30 || Pirates || 5–0 ||Gant (6–5) ||Musgrove (5–8) || || 38,561 || 75–59 || 7–3
|- bgcolor= ccffcc
| 135 || August 31 || Reds || 12–5 ||Gomber (5–0) ||Bailey (1–13) || || 42,365 || 76–59 ||8–2
|-

|- bgcolor= ffbbbb 
| 136 || September 1 || Reds || 0–4 || Castillo (8–11) || Poncedeleon (0–1) || || 46,368 || 76–60 || 7–3
|- bgcolor= ffbbbb
| 137 || September 2 || Reds || 4–6 (10) || Lorenzen (2–1) || Norris (3–4) || Iglesias (25) || 45,743 || 76–61 || 6–4
|- bgcolor= ffbbbb
| 138 || September 3 || @Nationals (ESPN) || 3–4 (10) || Holland (2–2) || Shreve (3–3) || || 28,648 || 76–62 || 5–5
|- bgcolor= ccffcc
| 139 || September 4 || @Nationals || 11–8 || Ross (8–9) || Williams (0–1) || Hicks (6) || 21,637 || 77–62 || 5–5
|- bgcolor= ccffcc
| 140 || September 5 || @Nationals || 7–6 || Mikolas (14–4) || Roark (8–15) || Martínez (1) || 22,124 || 78–62 || 6–4
|- bgcolor= ffbbbb
| 141 || September 7 || @Tigers || 3–5 || Greene (3–6) || Hicks (3–4) || || 21,268 || 78–63 || 5–5
|- bgcolor= ffbbbb
| 142 || September 8 || @Tigers || 3–4 || Greene (4–6) || Norris (3–5) || || 30,268 || 78–64 || 4–6
|- bgcolor= ccffcc
| 143 || September 9 || @Tigers || 5–2 || Gant (7–5) || Fulmer (3–11) || Martínez (2) || 22,212 || 79–64 || 5–5
|- bgcolor= ccffcc
| 144 || September 10 || Pirates || 8–7 || Brebbia (2–3) || Santana (2–3) || Martínez (3) || 33,566 || 80–64 || 5–5
|- bgcolor= ccffcc
| 145 || September 11 || Pirates || 11–5 || Mikolas (15–4) || Musgrove (6–9) || || 37,187 || 81–64 || 5–5
|- bgcolor= ffbbbb
| 146 || September 12 || Pirates || 3–4 || Taillon (13–9) || Poncedeleon (0–2) || Vázquez (32) || 39,606 || 81–65 || 5–5
|- bgcolor= ffbbbb
| 147 || September 13 || Dodgers || 7–9 || Kershaw (8–5) || Gomber (5–1) || || 40,997 || 81–66 || 5–5
|- bgcolor= ffbbbb
| 148 || September 14 || Dodgers || 0–3 || Buehler (7–5) || Flaherty (8–7) || Jansen (35) || 46,036 || 81–67 || 5–5
|- bgcolor= ffbbbb
| 149 || September 15 || Dodgers (Fox) || 4–17 || Hill (9–5) || Gant (7–6) || || 45,481 || 81–68 || 4–6
|- bgcolor= ccffcc
| 150 || September 16 || Dodgers (ESPN) || 5–0 || Wainwright (2–3) || Stripling (8–4) || || 45,217 || 82–68 || 4–6
|- bgcolor= ccffcc
| 151 || September 17 || @Braves || 11–6 || Mikolas (16–4) || Foltynewicz (11–10) || || 24,304 || 83–68 || 5–5
|- bgcolor= ccffcc
| 152 || September 18 || @Braves || 8–1 || Gomber (6–1) || Sánchez (6–6) || || 23,083 || 84–68 || 6–4
|- bgcolor= ffbbbb
| 153 || September 19 || @Braves || 3–7 || Toussaint (2–1) || Flaherty (8–8) || || 25,195 || 84–69 || 5–5
|- bgcolor= ccffcc
| 154 || September 21 || Giants || 5–3 || Brebbia (3–3) || Melancon (0–2) || Martínez (4) || 45,892 || 85–69 || 5–5
|- bgcolor= ccffcc
| 155 || September 22 || Giants (Fox) || 5–4 (10) || Martínez (8–6) || Melancon (0–3) || || 44,724 || 86–69 || 5–5
|- bgcolor= ccffcc
| 156 || September 23 || Giants || 9–2 || Mikolas (17–4) || Suarez (7–12) ||—|| 46,596 || 87–69 || 6–4
|- bgcolor= ffbbbb
| 157 || September 24 || Brewers || 4–6 || Burnes (7–0) || Norris (3–6) || Knebel (16) || 36,508 || 87–70 || 6–4
|- bgcolor= ffbbbb
| 158 || September 25 || Brewers || 4–12 || Williams (1&–3) || Gomber (6–2) ||—|| 38,051 || 87–71 || 6–4
|- bgcolor= ffbbbb
| 159 || September 26 || Brewers || 1–2 || Chacín (15–8) || Shreve (3–4) || Jeffress (13) || 40,644 || 87–72 || 6–4
|- bgcolor= ffbbbb
| 160 || September 28 || @Cubs || 4–8 || Hendricks (14–11) || Wainwright (2–4) ||—|| 39,442 || 87–73 || 5–5
|- bgcolor= ccffcc
| 161 || September 29 || @Cubs || 2–1 || Mikolas (18–4) || Hamels (9–12) || Martinez (5) || 40,784 || 88–73 || 5–5
|- bgcolor= ffbbbb
| 162 || September 30 || @Cubs || 5–10 || Webster (1–0) || Flaherty (8–9) ||—|| 39,275 || 88–74 || 4–6
|-

|-
| Legend:       = Win       = Loss       = PostponementBold = Cardinals player

Opening Day lineup

Roster

Injury DL report
(10-days, unless noted) 
Injury Report

 surgery date, not official date on the disabled list at St. Louis; AAA-Memphis disabled list on May 18

Statistics

Batting statistics
(through September 30)  

Sources:
2018 St. Louis Cardinals batting stats at Baseball Reference
2018 St. Louis Cardinals batting stats at ESPN.com

Pitching statistics
(through September 30) 

Sources:
2018 St.Louis Cardinals pitching stats at Baseball Reference
2018 St. Louis Cardinals pitching stats at ESPN.com

Records, awards, and milestones

Records

Awards
Major League Baseball All-Star Game selections

Other awards

Milestones

Executives and club officials
Source: Cardinals front office
Executive officers
Chairman and chief executive officer: William DeWitt, Jr.
 President: William DeWitt III
 Senior vice president & general counsel: Mike Whittle
 Vice president of business development: Dan Good
Baseball Operations department
 President of Baseball Operations: John Mozeliak
 General manager (GM) / Senior VP of Baseball Operations: Mike Girsch
 Assistant general manager: Moisés Rodriguez
 Sr. Special assistants to the GM: Bob Gebhard, Mike Jorgensen, Red Schoendienst
 Special assistants to the GM: Ryan Franklin, Willie McGee, Jose Oquendo, Matt Slater
 Director of player development: Gary LaRocque
 Director of baseball administration: John Vuch
 Administrator, Minor League Operations: Tony Ferreira
 Director of scouting: Randy Flores
 Special assistant to Amateur Scouting: Mike Roberts
 Manager, Scouting Analyst: Matt Bayer
 Amateur Scouting Coordinator/Analyst, Baseball Operations: Tyler Hadzinsky
 Baseball Operations analyst: Emily Wiebe
 Manager, Professional Scouting: Jared Odom
 Scouting analyst: Stacey Pettis (Northern California)
 Scouting analyst: Jim Negrych (Northeast)
 Scouting analyst: Chris Rodriguez (Pacific Northwest)
 Scouting analyst: Alix Martinez (Dominican Republic)
 Director of International Operations: Luis Morales (12/7/17)
 Assistant director of international scouting: 
 Field and academy development coordinator: Jose Leger (Latin America)
 Scouting supervisor: Jose Gonzalez Maestre (Venezuela)
 Director, Baseball Analytics & Systems: Jeremy Cohen
 Director, Baseball Development: Dane Sorensen
 Analysts, Baseball Development analysts: Kevin Seats, Brian Seyfert
 Manager, Baseball Systems: Patrick Casanta
 Director of player personnel: Matt Slater
 Director of Major League administration: Judy Carpenter-Barada
 Director of performance: Robert Butler
Manager/Coaching Staff
 Field Manager: Mike Shildt (interim, July 15- ) , Mike Matheny (through July 14)
 Pitching Coach: Mike Maddux (announced on Oct. 26, 2017) 
 Batting Coach: Mark Budaska (July 15- ), John Mabry (through July 14)
 Hitting Coach: George Greer (July 15- ), Bill Mueller (through July 14)
 First-Base Coach: Oliver Marmol
 Third-Base Coach: Jose Oquendo (announced on Oct. 23, 2017) 
 Bench Coach: Ron "Pop" Warner (July 19- ), Mike Shildt (announced 10/23/17-714/18) 
 Bullpen Coach: Bryan Eversgerd (announced on Oct. 26, 2017) 
 Bullpen Catcher/Catching Instructor: Jamie Pogue
 Coach: Willie McGee (announced on Oct. 23, 2017) 
 Strength/Cond. Coach: Pete Prinzi
 Assistant Field Coordinator: Ron "Pop" Warner (announced on Oct. 23, 2017-July 19, 2018) 
 Quality control Coach: 
Medical Staff
 Head Athletic Trainer: Adam Olsen
 Assistant Athletic Trainers: Chris Conroy, Jeremy Clipperton
 Head Orthopedic Surgeon: George Paletta, MD
 Team Orthopedist: Lyndon Gross, MD
 Team Orthopedist: Julienne Lippe, MD
 Team Orthopedist: Husam Nawas, MD
 Team Internist: Joshua Binek, MD
 Primary Care Sport Medicine & MiLB Liaison: Brian Mahaffey, MD
 Team physician: Charles Rehm, MD
 Team physician: Alok Sengupta, MD
 Senior Medical Advisor: Barry Weinberg
 Physical Therapist: Thomas Knox
 Performance Specialist: Jason Shutt

Clubhouse Staff
 Equipment managers: Ernie Moore, Mark Walsh
 Traveling secretary: C. J. Cherre
 Visiting Clubhouse Manager: Rip Rowan
 Video Coordinator, Major Leagues: Chad Blair
 Assistant Video Coordinator, Major Leagues: Ben Bultmann
Communications department
 Vice president: Ron Watermon 
 Director: Brian Bartow
Cardinals Care and community relations department
 Vice president for community relations & executive director for Cardinals Care: Michael Hall
 Vice president for event services and merchandising: Vicki Bryant
Finance and administration department
 Senior vice president and chief financial officer: Brad Wood
Stadium Operations department
 Vice president: Matt Gifford
Ticket sales, marketing & corporate sales department
 Senior vice president of sales & marketing: Dan Farrell

Minor league system and first-year player draft

Teams

Major League Baseball draft

The 2018 Major League Baseball (MLB) First-Year Player Draft began on Monday, June 4, 2018, at Secaucus, NJ, and ended on June 6. The draft assigned amateur baseball players to MLB teams.

2018 Draft Order

2018 Draft Tracker (StL Cardinals)

References

External links
St. Louis Cardinals 2018 schedule at MLB.com
2018 St. Louis Cardinals at ESPN
2018 St. Louis Cardinals season at Baseball Reference

St. Louis Cardinals seasons
St. Louis Cardinals
St. Louis Cardinals